

512001–512100 

|-bgcolor=#E9E9E9
| 512001 ||  || — || February 12, 2010 || Socorro || LINEAR ||  || align=right | 1.7 km || 
|-id=002 bgcolor=#E9E9E9
| 512002 ||  || — || January 24, 2014 || Haleakala || Pan-STARRS ||  || align=right | 1.1 km || 
|-id=003 bgcolor=#d6d6d6
| 512003 ||  || — || November 13, 2007 || Kitt Peak || Spacewatch ||  || align=right | 2.9 km || 
|-id=004 bgcolor=#E9E9E9
| 512004 ||  || — || November 29, 2013 || Mount Lemmon || Mount Lemmon Survey ||  || align=right | 1.4 km || 
|-id=005 bgcolor=#E9E9E9
| 512005 ||  || — || March 26, 2006 || Kitt Peak || Spacewatch ||  || align=right | 1.5 km || 
|-id=006 bgcolor=#E9E9E9
| 512006 ||  || — || November 3, 2008 || Mount Lemmon || Mount Lemmon Survey ||  || align=right | 1.4 km || 
|-id=007 bgcolor=#d6d6d6
| 512007 ||  || — || October 18, 2011 || Haleakala || Pan-STARRS ||  || align=right | 3.5 km || 
|-id=008 bgcolor=#fefefe
| 512008 ||  || — || December 5, 2010 || Mount Lemmon || Mount Lemmon Survey ||  || align=right data-sort-value="0.79" | 790 m || 
|-id=009 bgcolor=#E9E9E9
| 512009 ||  || — || February 14, 2015 || Mount Lemmon || Mount Lemmon Survey ||  || align=right | 1.3 km || 
|-id=010 bgcolor=#E9E9E9
| 512010 ||  || — || January 25, 2014 || Haleakala || Pan-STARRS ||  || align=right data-sort-value="0.95" | 950 m || 
|-id=011 bgcolor=#fefefe
| 512011 ||  || — || January 30, 2011 || Haleakala || Pan-STARRS ||  || align=right data-sort-value="0.65" | 650 m || 
|-id=012 bgcolor=#E9E9E9
| 512012 ||  || — || September 27, 2012 || Haleakala || Pan-STARRS ||  || align=right | 3.3 km || 
|-id=013 bgcolor=#E9E9E9
| 512013 ||  || — || June 13, 2015 || Haleakala || Pan-STARRS ||  || align=right | 1.4 km || 
|-id=014 bgcolor=#fefefe
| 512014 ||  || — || October 7, 2012 || Haleakala || Pan-STARRS ||  || align=right data-sort-value="0.93" | 930 m || 
|-id=015 bgcolor=#fefefe
| 512015 ||  || — || December 25, 2013 || Kitt Peak || Spacewatch ||  || align=right data-sort-value="0.91" | 910 m || 
|-id=016 bgcolor=#d6d6d6
| 512016 ||  || — || May 9, 2014 || Haleakala || Pan-STARRS ||  || align=right | 3.5 km || 
|-id=017 bgcolor=#d6d6d6
| 512017 ||  || — || June 13, 2015 || Haleakala || Pan-STARRS ||  || align=right | 2.0 km || 
|-id=018 bgcolor=#d6d6d6
| 512018 ||  || — || January 16, 2013 || Haleakala || Pan-STARRS ||  || align=right | 2.2 km || 
|-id=019 bgcolor=#E9E9E9
| 512019 ||  || — || January 16, 2013 || Haleakala || Pan-STARRS ||  || align=right | 2.4 km || 
|-id=020 bgcolor=#d6d6d6
| 512020 ||  || — || April 15, 2015 || Kitt Peak || Spacewatch ||  || align=right | 2.5 km || 
|-id=021 bgcolor=#E9E9E9
| 512021 ||  || — || October 21, 2008 || Kitt Peak || Spacewatch ||  || align=right | 2.0 km || 
|-id=022 bgcolor=#E9E9E9
| 512022 ||  || — || May 24, 2006 || Kitt Peak || Spacewatch ||  || align=right | 2.4 km || 
|-id=023 bgcolor=#E9E9E9
| 512023 ||  || — || April 10, 2015 || Mount Lemmon || Mount Lemmon Survey ||  || align=right | 2.6 km || 
|-id=024 bgcolor=#E9E9E9
| 512024 ||  || — || December 18, 2004 || Mount Lemmon || Mount Lemmon Survey ||  || align=right | 1.7 km || 
|-id=025 bgcolor=#fefefe
| 512025 ||  || — || April 15, 2007 || Catalina || CSS ||  || align=right data-sort-value="0.94" | 940 m || 
|-id=026 bgcolor=#E9E9E9
| 512026 ||  || — || April 20, 2015 || Haleakala || Pan-STARRS ||  || align=right data-sort-value="0.91" | 910 m || 
|-id=027 bgcolor=#E9E9E9
| 512027 ||  || — || March 25, 2010 || Kitt Peak || Spacewatch ||  || align=right | 1.9 km || 
|-id=028 bgcolor=#E9E9E9
| 512028 ||  || — || January 15, 2004 || Kitt Peak || Spacewatch ||  || align=right | 2.1 km || 
|-id=029 bgcolor=#E9E9E9
| 512029 ||  || — || February 10, 2014 || Haleakala || Pan-STARRS ||  || align=right | 1.4 km || 
|-id=030 bgcolor=#d6d6d6
| 512030 ||  || — || October 24, 2011 || Haleakala || Pan-STARRS ||  || align=right | 2.2 km || 
|-id=031 bgcolor=#d6d6d6
| 512031 ||  || — || July 29, 2009 || Catalina || CSS || 7:4* || align=right | 3.4 km || 
|-id=032 bgcolor=#E9E9E9
| 512032 ||  || — || December 3, 2012 || Mount Lemmon || Mount Lemmon Survey ||  || align=right | 1.3 km || 
|-id=033 bgcolor=#E9E9E9
| 512033 ||  || — || June 13, 2015 || Mount Lemmon || Mount Lemmon Survey ||  || align=right | 1.4 km || 
|-id=034 bgcolor=#d6d6d6
| 512034 ||  || — || September 24, 2011 || Haleakala || Pan-STARRS ||  || align=right | 2.7 km || 
|-id=035 bgcolor=#E9E9E9
| 512035 ||  || — || November 2, 2007 || Mount Lemmon || Mount Lemmon Survey ||  || align=right | 2.6 km || 
|-id=036 bgcolor=#E9E9E9
| 512036 ||  || — || February 27, 2015 || Haleakala || Pan-STARRS ||  || align=right | 1.5 km || 
|-id=037 bgcolor=#E9E9E9
| 512037 ||  || — || July 25, 2011 || Haleakala || Pan-STARRS ||  || align=right | 1.1 km || 
|-id=038 bgcolor=#E9E9E9
| 512038 ||  || — || September 23, 2011 || Haleakala || Pan-STARRS ||  || align=right | 2.1 km || 
|-id=039 bgcolor=#E9E9E9
| 512039 ||  || — || September 4, 2011 || Haleakala || Pan-STARRS ||  || align=right | 2.2 km || 
|-id=040 bgcolor=#E9E9E9
| 512040 ||  || — || April 27, 2006 || Catalina || CSS ||  || align=right | 2.5 km || 
|-id=041 bgcolor=#E9E9E9
| 512041 ||  || — || October 26, 2008 || Kitt Peak || Spacewatch ||  || align=right | 2.2 km || 
|-id=042 bgcolor=#E9E9E9
| 512042 ||  || — || June 28, 2011 || Mount Lemmon || Mount Lemmon Survey ||  || align=right data-sort-value="0.85" | 850 m || 
|-id=043 bgcolor=#d6d6d6
| 512043 ||  || — || January 16, 2008 || Kitt Peak || Spacewatch ||  || align=right | 2.2 km || 
|-id=044 bgcolor=#E9E9E9
| 512044 ||  || — || January 1, 2009 || Kitt Peak || Spacewatch ||  || align=right | 1.9 km || 
|-id=045 bgcolor=#d6d6d6
| 512045 ||  || — || November 21, 2006 || Mount Lemmon || Mount Lemmon Survey ||  || align=right | 2.5 km || 
|-id=046 bgcolor=#E9E9E9
| 512046 ||  || — || December 5, 2007 || Catalina || CSS ||  || align=right | 1.2 km || 
|-id=047 bgcolor=#d6d6d6
| 512047 ||  || — || December 30, 2007 || Kitt Peak || Spacewatch ||  || align=right | 2.5 km || 
|-id=048 bgcolor=#d6d6d6
| 512048 ||  || — || February 28, 2008 || Mount Lemmon || Mount Lemmon Survey ||  || align=right | 2.7 km || 
|-id=049 bgcolor=#d6d6d6
| 512049 ||  || — || June 18, 2015 || Haleakala || Pan-STARRS ||  || align=right | 2.6 km || 
|-id=050 bgcolor=#E9E9E9
| 512050 ||  || — || December 11, 2012 || Mount Lemmon || Mount Lemmon Survey ||  || align=right | 1.9 km || 
|-id=051 bgcolor=#E9E9E9
| 512051 ||  || — || September 8, 2011 || Haleakala || Pan-STARRS ||  || align=right | 1.7 km || 
|-id=052 bgcolor=#fefefe
| 512052 ||  || — || April 6, 2011 || Mount Lemmon || Mount Lemmon Survey ||  || align=right data-sort-value="0.98" | 980 m || 
|-id=053 bgcolor=#d6d6d6
| 512053 ||  || — || February 11, 2014 || Mount Lemmon || Mount Lemmon Survey ||  || align=right | 3.1 km || 
|-id=054 bgcolor=#E9E9E9
| 512054 ||  || — || January 31, 2014 || Haleakala || Pan-STARRS ||  || align=right | 1.3 km || 
|-id=055 bgcolor=#d6d6d6
| 512055 ||  || — || June 23, 2015 || Haleakala || Pan-STARRS ||  || align=right | 2.6 km || 
|-id=056 bgcolor=#E9E9E9
| 512056 ||  || — || February 1, 2009 || Mount Lemmon || Mount Lemmon Survey ||  || align=right | 2.2 km || 
|-id=057 bgcolor=#d6d6d6
| 512057 ||  || — || September 9, 2010 || Kitt Peak || Spacewatch ||  || align=right | 2.1 km || 
|-id=058 bgcolor=#d6d6d6
| 512058 ||  || — || March 24, 2014 || Haleakala || Pan-STARRS ||  || align=right | 2.7 km || 
|-id=059 bgcolor=#E9E9E9
| 512059 ||  || — || November 8, 2007 || Mount Lemmon || Mount Lemmon Survey ||  || align=right | 2.1 km || 
|-id=060 bgcolor=#d6d6d6
| 512060 ||  || — || April 5, 2014 || Haleakala || Pan-STARRS ||  || align=right | 2.1 km || 
|-id=061 bgcolor=#E9E9E9
| 512061 ||  || — || October 30, 2008 || Kitt Peak || Spacewatch ||  || align=right | 1.9 km || 
|-id=062 bgcolor=#E9E9E9
| 512062 ||  || — || December 5, 2013 || Haleakala || Pan-STARRS ||  || align=right | 2.1 km || 
|-id=063 bgcolor=#d6d6d6
| 512063 ||  || — || May 4, 2014 || Mount Lemmon || Mount Lemmon Survey ||  || align=right | 3.0 km || 
|-id=064 bgcolor=#d6d6d6
| 512064 ||  || — || August 13, 2010 || Kitt Peak || Spacewatch ||  || align=right | 1.9 km || 
|-id=065 bgcolor=#E9E9E9
| 512065 ||  || — || February 13, 2010 || Mount Lemmon || Mount Lemmon Survey ||  || align=right data-sort-value="0.84" | 840 m || 
|-id=066 bgcolor=#d6d6d6
| 512066 ||  || — || August 8, 2004 || Socorro || LINEAR ||  || align=right | 3.6 km || 
|-id=067 bgcolor=#d6d6d6
| 512067 ||  || — || October 25, 2011 || Haleakala || Pan-STARRS ||  || align=right | 2.8 km || 
|-id=068 bgcolor=#d6d6d6
| 512068 ||  || — || September 27, 2011 || Mount Lemmon || Mount Lemmon Survey ||  || align=right | 2.4 km || 
|-id=069 bgcolor=#E9E9E9
| 512069 ||  || — || April 4, 2014 || Haleakala || Pan-STARRS ||  || align=right | 2.0 km || 
|-id=070 bgcolor=#E9E9E9
| 512070 ||  || — || January 2, 2009 || Kitt Peak || Spacewatch ||  || align=right | 1.9 km || 
|-id=071 bgcolor=#d6d6d6
| 512071 ||  || — || December 27, 2006 || Mount Lemmon || Mount Lemmon Survey ||  || align=right | 3.7 km || 
|-id=072 bgcolor=#d6d6d6
| 512072 ||  || — || May 3, 2014 || Mount Lemmon || Mount Lemmon Survey ||  || align=right | 2.7 km || 
|-id=073 bgcolor=#d6d6d6
| 512073 ||  || — || May 4, 2014 || Haleakala || Pan-STARRS ||  || align=right | 2.9 km || 
|-id=074 bgcolor=#d6d6d6
| 512074 ||  || — || December 27, 2006 || Mount Lemmon || Mount Lemmon Survey ||  || align=right | 3.4 km || 
|-id=075 bgcolor=#E9E9E9
| 512075 ||  || — || February 26, 2014 || Haleakala || Pan-STARRS ||  || align=right | 1.3 km || 
|-id=076 bgcolor=#E9E9E9
| 512076 ||  || — || August 24, 2011 || Haleakala || Pan-STARRS ||  || align=right | 1.7 km || 
|-id=077 bgcolor=#d6d6d6
| 512077 ||  || — || June 23, 2010 || Mount Lemmon || Mount Lemmon Survey ||  || align=right | 2.7 km || 
|-id=078 bgcolor=#d6d6d6
| 512078 ||  || — || June 18, 2015 || Haleakala || Pan-STARRS ||  || align=right | 2.5 km || 
|-id=079 bgcolor=#E9E9E9
| 512079 ||  || — || January 30, 2006 || Kitt Peak || Spacewatch ||  || align=right data-sort-value="0.88" | 880 m || 
|-id=080 bgcolor=#E9E9E9
| 512080 ||  || — || September 2, 2011 || Haleakala || Pan-STARRS ||  || align=right | 2.0 km || 
|-id=081 bgcolor=#fefefe
| 512081 ||  || — || March 25, 2011 || Haleakala || Pan-STARRS ||  || align=right | 1.0 km || 
|-id=082 bgcolor=#d6d6d6
| 512082 ||  || — || February 27, 2008 || Mount Lemmon || Mount Lemmon Survey ||  || align=right | 3.1 km || 
|-id=083 bgcolor=#d6d6d6
| 512083 ||  || — || July 28, 2010 || WISE || WISE ||  || align=right | 2.8 km || 
|-id=084 bgcolor=#fefefe
| 512084 ||  || — || September 24, 2008 || Mount Lemmon || Mount Lemmon Survey ||  || align=right data-sort-value="0.69" | 690 m || 
|-id=085 bgcolor=#E9E9E9
| 512085 ||  || — || June 27, 2015 || Haleakala || Pan-STARRS ||  || align=right | 1.6 km || 
|-id=086 bgcolor=#E9E9E9
| 512086 ||  || — || October 1, 2003 || Kitt Peak || Spacewatch ||  || align=right | 1.8 km || 
|-id=087 bgcolor=#d6d6d6
| 512087 ||  || — || January 10, 2007 || Kitt Peak || Spacewatch ||  || align=right | 3.7 km || 
|-id=088 bgcolor=#d6d6d6
| 512088 ||  || — || June 25, 2010 || WISE || WISE ||  || align=right | 3.7 km || 
|-id=089 bgcolor=#d6d6d6
| 512089 ||  || — || June 21, 2010 || WISE || WISE ||  || align=right | 3.3 km || 
|-id=090 bgcolor=#d6d6d6
| 512090 ||  || — || March 8, 2013 || Haleakala || Pan-STARRS ||  || align=right | 2.7 km || 
|-id=091 bgcolor=#E9E9E9
| 512091 ||  || — || June 29, 2015 || Haleakala || Pan-STARRS ||  || align=right | 1.9 km || 
|-id=092 bgcolor=#d6d6d6
| 512092 ||  || — || February 13, 2013 || Haleakala || Pan-STARRS ||  || align=right | 2.8 km || 
|-id=093 bgcolor=#fefefe
| 512093 ||  || — || April 25, 2003 || Kitt Peak || Spacewatch ||  || align=right data-sort-value="0.88" | 880 m || 
|-id=094 bgcolor=#E9E9E9
| 512094 ||  || — || May 8, 2006 || Mount Lemmon || Mount Lemmon Survey ||  || align=right | 1.4 km || 
|-id=095 bgcolor=#fefefe
| 512095 ||  || — || November 8, 2008 || Mount Lemmon || Mount Lemmon Survey ||  || align=right data-sort-value="0.81" | 810 m || 
|-id=096 bgcolor=#E9E9E9
| 512096 ||  || — || December 15, 2004 || Kitt Peak || Spacewatch ||  || align=right | 2.1 km || 
|-id=097 bgcolor=#fefefe
| 512097 ||  || — || May 11, 2007 || Mount Lemmon || Mount Lemmon Survey ||  || align=right data-sort-value="0.85" | 850 m || 
|-id=098 bgcolor=#E9E9E9
| 512098 ||  || — || December 18, 2003 || Kitt Peak || Spacewatch ||  || align=right | 1.9 km || 
|-id=099 bgcolor=#d6d6d6
| 512099 ||  || — || March 3, 2009 || Catalina || CSS ||  || align=right | 3.4 km || 
|-id=100 bgcolor=#E9E9E9
| 512100 ||  || — || August 19, 2006 || Kitt Peak || Spacewatch ||  || align=right | 2.6 km || 
|}

512101–512200 

|-bgcolor=#fefefe
| 512101 ||  || — || August 4, 2008 || Siding Spring || SSS ||  || align=right data-sort-value="0.82" | 820 m || 
|-id=102 bgcolor=#d6d6d6
| 512102 ||  || — || May 22, 2014 || Kitt Peak || Spacewatch ||  || align=right | 2.9 km || 
|-id=103 bgcolor=#E9E9E9
| 512103 ||  || — || September 26, 2006 || Mount Lemmon || Mount Lemmon Survey ||  || align=right | 2.0 km || 
|-id=104 bgcolor=#d6d6d6
| 512104 ||  || — || October 26, 2011 || Haleakala || Pan-STARRS ||  || align=right | 2.8 km || 
|-id=105 bgcolor=#E9E9E9
| 512105 ||  || — || May 21, 2006 || Kitt Peak || Spacewatch ||  || align=right | 1.2 km || 
|-id=106 bgcolor=#d6d6d6
| 512106 ||  || — || November 27, 2006 || Mount Lemmon || Mount Lemmon Survey ||  || align=right | 2.9 km || 
|-id=107 bgcolor=#d6d6d6
| 512107 ||  || — || January 19, 2012 || Haleakala || Pan-STARRS ||  || align=right | 3.4 km || 
|-id=108 bgcolor=#d6d6d6
| 512108 ||  || — || September 14, 2010 || Mount Lemmon || Mount Lemmon Survey ||  || align=right | 3.5 km || 
|-id=109 bgcolor=#d6d6d6
| 512109 ||  || — || November 17, 2006 || Mount Lemmon || Mount Lemmon Survey ||  || align=right | 3.6 km || 
|-id=110 bgcolor=#d6d6d6
| 512110 ||  || — || April 30, 2014 || Haleakala || Pan-STARRS ||  || align=right | 2.6 km || 
|-id=111 bgcolor=#d6d6d6
| 512111 ||  || — || April 30, 2014 || Haleakala || Pan-STARRS ||  || align=right | 2.2 km || 
|-id=112 bgcolor=#d6d6d6
| 512112 ||  || — || February 16, 2013 || Mount Lemmon || Mount Lemmon Survey ||  || align=right | 2.8 km || 
|-id=113 bgcolor=#d6d6d6
| 512113 ||  || — || December 28, 2011 || Mount Lemmon || Mount Lemmon Survey ||  || align=right | 2.8 km || 
|-id=114 bgcolor=#E9E9E9
| 512114 ||  || — || December 31, 2008 || Kitt Peak || Spacewatch ||  || align=right | 1.9 km || 
|-id=115 bgcolor=#d6d6d6
| 512115 ||  || — || July 26, 2015 || Haleakala || Pan-STARRS ||  || align=right | 3.0 km || 
|-id=116 bgcolor=#d6d6d6
| 512116 ||  || — || June 16, 2009 || Mount Lemmon || Mount Lemmon Survey ||  || align=right | 4.0 km || 
|-id=117 bgcolor=#d6d6d6
| 512117 ||  || — || February 15, 2013 || Haleakala || Pan-STARRS ||  || align=right | 2.9 km || 
|-id=118 bgcolor=#d6d6d6
| 512118 ||  || — || August 8, 2005 || Siding Spring || SSS ||  || align=right | 2.3 km || 
|-id=119 bgcolor=#E9E9E9
| 512119 ||  || — || November 20, 2007 || Kitt Peak || Spacewatch ||  || align=right | 2.1 km || 
|-id=120 bgcolor=#d6d6d6
| 512120 ||  || — || October 29, 2005 || Mount Lemmon || Mount Lemmon Survey ||  || align=right | 2.2 km || 
|-id=121 bgcolor=#fefefe
| 512121 ||  || — || July 26, 2008 || Siding Spring || SSS ||  || align=right data-sort-value="0.79" | 790 m || 
|-id=122 bgcolor=#E9E9E9
| 512122 ||  || — || October 19, 2011 || Haleakala || Pan-STARRS ||  || align=right | 2.5 km || 
|-id=123 bgcolor=#d6d6d6
| 512123 ||  || — || November 1, 2006 || Mount Lemmon || Mount Lemmon Survey ||  || align=right | 2.0 km || 
|-id=124 bgcolor=#d6d6d6
| 512124 ||  || — || October 10, 2005 || Kitt Peak || Spacewatch ||  || align=right | 2.5 km || 
|-id=125 bgcolor=#fefefe
| 512125 ||  || — || August 23, 2004 || Kitt Peak || Spacewatch ||  || align=right data-sort-value="0.62" | 620 m || 
|-id=126 bgcolor=#E9E9E9
| 512126 ||  || — || October 8, 2007 || Catalina || CSS ||  || align=right | 1.8 km || 
|-id=127 bgcolor=#d6d6d6
| 512127 ||  || — || January 20, 2013 || Kitt Peak || Spacewatch ||  || align=right | 3.0 km || 
|-id=128 bgcolor=#d6d6d6
| 512128 ||  || — || October 25, 2005 || Mount Lemmon || Mount Lemmon Survey ||  || align=right | 2.4 km || 
|-id=129 bgcolor=#d6d6d6
| 512129 ||  || — || January 27, 2007 || Kitt Peak || Spacewatch ||  || align=right | 3.1 km || 
|-id=130 bgcolor=#E9E9E9
| 512130 ||  || — || March 1, 2009 || Mount Lemmon || Mount Lemmon Survey ||  || align=right | 2.5 km || 
|-id=131 bgcolor=#E9E9E9
| 512131 ||  || — || August 22, 2007 || Anderson Mesa || LONEOS ||  || align=right data-sort-value="0.94" | 940 m || 
|-id=132 bgcolor=#d6d6d6
| 512132 ||  || — || October 23, 2011 || Haleakala || Pan-STARRS ||  || align=right | 3.0 km || 
|-id=133 bgcolor=#d6d6d6
| 512133 ||  || — || September 3, 2010 || Mount Lemmon || Mount Lemmon Survey ||  || align=right | 2.4 km || 
|-id=134 bgcolor=#d6d6d6
| 512134 ||  || — || March 30, 2008 || Kitt Peak || Spacewatch ||  || align=right | 2.4 km || 
|-id=135 bgcolor=#d6d6d6
| 512135 ||  || — || December 21, 2006 || Mount Lemmon || Mount Lemmon Survey ||  || align=right | 2.9 km || 
|-id=136 bgcolor=#E9E9E9
| 512136 ||  || — || March 11, 2014 || Mount Lemmon || Mount Lemmon Survey ||  || align=right | 2.2 km || 
|-id=137 bgcolor=#d6d6d6
| 512137 ||  || — || May 7, 2014 || Haleakala || Pan-STARRS ||  || align=right | 3.3 km || 
|-id=138 bgcolor=#E9E9E9
| 512138 ||  || — || January 25, 2009 || Kitt Peak || Spacewatch ||  || align=right | 1.5 km || 
|-id=139 bgcolor=#E9E9E9
| 512139 ||  || — || March 16, 2010 || Kitt Peak || Spacewatch ||  || align=right | 1.3 km || 
|-id=140 bgcolor=#E9E9E9
| 512140 ||  || — || September 23, 2011 || Haleakala || Pan-STARRS ||  || align=right | 1.8 km || 
|-id=141 bgcolor=#E9E9E9
| 512141 ||  || — || January 2, 2009 || Kitt Peak || Spacewatch ||  || align=right | 1.8 km || 
|-id=142 bgcolor=#d6d6d6
| 512142 ||  || — || July 18, 2015 || Haleakala || Pan-STARRS ||  || align=right | 2.1 km || 
|-id=143 bgcolor=#d6d6d6
| 512143 ||  || — || October 1, 2005 || Mount Lemmon || Mount Lemmon Survey ||  || align=right | 1.9 km || 
|-id=144 bgcolor=#fefefe
| 512144 ||  || — || October 29, 2008 || Kitt Peak || Spacewatch ||  || align=right data-sort-value="0.89" | 890 m || 
|-id=145 bgcolor=#d6d6d6
| 512145 ||  || — || August 8, 1999 || Kitt Peak || Spacewatch || EOS || align=right | 1.9 km || 
|-id=146 bgcolor=#E9E9E9
| 512146 ||  || — || March 12, 2014 || Mount Lemmon || Mount Lemmon Survey ||  || align=right | 1.7 km || 
|-id=147 bgcolor=#d6d6d6
| 512147 ||  || — || August 10, 2015 || Haleakala || Pan-STARRS ||  || align=right | 2.9 km || 
|-id=148 bgcolor=#d6d6d6
| 512148 ||  || — || April 5, 2014 || Haleakala || Pan-STARRS ||  || align=right | 2.3 km || 
|-id=149 bgcolor=#d6d6d6
| 512149 ||  || — || September 28, 2011 || Mount Lemmon || Mount Lemmon Survey || KOR || align=right | 1.2 km || 
|-id=150 bgcolor=#E9E9E9
| 512150 ||  || — || May 27, 2006 || Catalina || CSS ||  || align=right | 1.6 km || 
|-id=151 bgcolor=#d6d6d6
| 512151 ||  || — || February 8, 2007 || Mount Lemmon || Mount Lemmon Survey ||  || align=right | 3.2 km || 
|-id=152 bgcolor=#d6d6d6
| 512152 ||  || — || March 31, 2014 || Kitt Peak || Spacewatch || EOS || align=right | 2.3 km || 
|-id=153 bgcolor=#d6d6d6
| 512153 ||  || — || June 18, 2014 || Mount Lemmon || Mount Lemmon Survey || Tj (2.97) || align=right | 3.5 km || 
|-id=154 bgcolor=#E9E9E9
| 512154 ||  || — || January 1, 2008 || Kitt Peak || Spacewatch || AGN || align=right | 1.0 km || 
|-id=155 bgcolor=#E9E9E9
| 512155 ||  || — || February 22, 2009 || Kitt Peak || Spacewatch ||  || align=right | 1.5 km || 
|-id=156 bgcolor=#E9E9E9
| 512156 ||  || — || September 8, 2011 || Kitt Peak || Spacewatch ||  || align=right | 2.4 km || 
|-id=157 bgcolor=#d6d6d6
| 512157 ||  || — || March 12, 2008 || Kitt Peak || Spacewatch ||  || align=right | 2.3 km || 
|-id=158 bgcolor=#E9E9E9
| 512158 ||  || — || February 14, 2010 || Mount Lemmon || Mount Lemmon Survey ||  || align=right | 1.5 km || 
|-id=159 bgcolor=#d6d6d6
| 512159 ||  || — || September 22, 2009 || Mount Lemmon || Mount Lemmon Survey ||  || align=right | 3.1 km || 
|-id=160 bgcolor=#d6d6d6
| 512160 ||  || — || July 23, 2010 || WISE || WISE ||  || align=right | 3.3 km || 
|-id=161 bgcolor=#d6d6d6
| 512161 ||  || — || February 22, 2007 || Kitt Peak || Spacewatch ||  || align=right | 2.9 km || 
|-id=162 bgcolor=#fefefe
| 512162 ||  || — || September 7, 2004 || Kitt Peak || Spacewatch ||  || align=right data-sort-value="0.71" | 710 m || 
|-id=163 bgcolor=#E9E9E9
| 512163 ||  || — || September 21, 2011 || Catalina || CSS ||  || align=right | 1.3 km || 
|-id=164 bgcolor=#d6d6d6
| 512164 ||  || — || October 7, 2004 || Kitt Peak || Spacewatch ||  || align=right | 2.2 km || 
|-id=165 bgcolor=#fefefe
| 512165 ||  || — || July 25, 2011 || Haleakala || Pan-STARRS ||  || align=right data-sort-value="0.78" | 780 m || 
|-id=166 bgcolor=#d6d6d6
| 512166 ||  || — || August 25, 2004 || Kitt Peak || Spacewatch ||  || align=right | 4.0 km || 
|-id=167 bgcolor=#d6d6d6
| 512167 ||  || — || November 2, 2010 || Mount Lemmon || Mount Lemmon Survey ||  || align=right | 3.8 km || 
|-id=168 bgcolor=#d6d6d6
| 512168 ||  || — || July 14, 2009 || Kitt Peak || Spacewatch ||  || align=right | 3.4 km || 
|-id=169 bgcolor=#fefefe
| 512169 ||  || — || October 27, 2005 || Kitt Peak || Spacewatch ||  || align=right data-sort-value="0.78" | 780 m || 
|-id=170 bgcolor=#d6d6d6
| 512170 ||  || — || February 15, 2013 || Haleakala || Pan-STARRS ||  || align=right | 3.2 km || 
|-id=171 bgcolor=#d6d6d6
| 512171 ||  || — || September 7, 1999 || Kitt Peak || Spacewatch ||  || align=right | 2.8 km || 
|-id=172 bgcolor=#E9E9E9
| 512172 ||  || — || March 3, 2000 || Socorro || LINEAR ||  || align=right | 2.5 km || 
|-id=173 bgcolor=#d6d6d6
| 512173 ||  || — || January 27, 2007 || Mount Lemmon || Mount Lemmon Survey ||  || align=right | 3.0 km || 
|-id=174 bgcolor=#fefefe
| 512174 ||  || — || July 25, 2011 || Haleakala || Pan-STARRS ||  || align=right data-sort-value="0.86" | 860 m || 
|-id=175 bgcolor=#fefefe
| 512175 ||  || — || March 10, 2007 || Kitt Peak || Spacewatch ||  || align=right data-sort-value="0.82" | 820 m || 
|-id=176 bgcolor=#d6d6d6
| 512176 ||  || — || January 17, 2007 || Kitt Peak || Spacewatch ||  || align=right | 3.0 km || 
|-id=177 bgcolor=#d6d6d6
| 512177 ||  || — || March 26, 2007 || Mount Lemmon || Mount Lemmon Survey ||  || align=right | 3.2 km || 
|-id=178 bgcolor=#d6d6d6
| 512178 ||  || — || February 3, 2012 || Haleakala || Pan-STARRS ||  || align=right | 2.9 km || 
|-id=179 bgcolor=#d6d6d6
| 512179 ||  || — || November 25, 2005 || Catalina || CSS ||  || align=right | 3.1 km || 
|-id=180 bgcolor=#E9E9E9
| 512180 ||  || — || March 3, 2009 || Kitt Peak || Spacewatch ||  || align=right | 2.8 km || 
|-id=181 bgcolor=#d6d6d6
| 512181 ||  || — || November 2, 2010 || Kitt Peak || Spacewatch ||  || align=right | 2.8 km || 
|-id=182 bgcolor=#d6d6d6
| 512182 ||  || — || October 17, 2010 || Mount Lemmon || Mount Lemmon Survey ||  || align=right | 2.9 km || 
|-id=183 bgcolor=#d6d6d6
| 512183 ||  || — || June 24, 2014 || Haleakala || Pan-STARRS ||  || align=right | 2.9 km || 
|-id=184 bgcolor=#fefefe
| 512184 ||  || — || May 10, 2007 || Mount Lemmon || Mount Lemmon Survey ||  || align=right data-sort-value="0.94" | 940 m || 
|-id=185 bgcolor=#d6d6d6
| 512185 ||  || — || November 11, 2010 || Mount Lemmon || Mount Lemmon Survey ||  || align=right | 2.4 km || 
|-id=186 bgcolor=#fefefe
| 512186 ||  || — || December 19, 2004 || Mount Lemmon || Mount Lemmon Survey ||  || align=right data-sort-value="0.86" | 860 m || 
|-id=187 bgcolor=#E9E9E9
| 512187 ||  || — || August 29, 2006 || Kitt Peak || Spacewatch ||  || align=right | 1.1 km || 
|-id=188 bgcolor=#fefefe
| 512188 ||  || — || November 6, 2008 || Mount Lemmon || Mount Lemmon Survey ||  || align=right data-sort-value="0.94" | 940 m || 
|-id=189 bgcolor=#d6d6d6
| 512189 ||  || — || January 27, 2007 || Mount Lemmon || Mount Lemmon Survey ||  || align=right | 2.9 km || 
|-id=190 bgcolor=#fefefe
| 512190 ||  || — || October 27, 2008 || Mount Lemmon || Mount Lemmon Survey ||  || align=right data-sort-value="0.90" | 900 m || 
|-id=191 bgcolor=#d6d6d6
| 512191 ||  || — || May 3, 2008 || Mount Lemmon || Mount Lemmon Survey ||  || align=right | 3.3 km || 
|-id=192 bgcolor=#E9E9E9
| 512192 ||  || — || April 11, 2005 || Mount Lemmon || Mount Lemmon Survey ||  || align=right | 1.8 km || 
|-id=193 bgcolor=#d6d6d6
| 512193 ||  || — || March 6, 2013 || Haleakala || Pan-STARRS ||  || align=right | 2.6 km || 
|-id=194 bgcolor=#d6d6d6
| 512194 ||  || — || May 8, 2014 || Haleakala || Pan-STARRS ||  || align=right | 2.3 km || 
|-id=195 bgcolor=#d6d6d6
| 512195 ||  || — || November 15, 2010 || Mount Lemmon || Mount Lemmon Survey ||  || align=right | 3.3 km || 
|-id=196 bgcolor=#d6d6d6
| 512196 ||  || — || November 25, 2006 || Mount Lemmon || Mount Lemmon Survey ||  || align=right | 3.7 km || 
|-id=197 bgcolor=#E9E9E9
| 512197 ||  || — || April 7, 2005 || Mount Lemmon || Mount Lemmon Survey ||  || align=right | 2.0 km || 
|-id=198 bgcolor=#d6d6d6
| 512198 ||  || — || October 4, 2004 || Kitt Peak || Spacewatch ||  || align=right | 2.5 km || 
|-id=199 bgcolor=#d6d6d6
| 512199 ||  || — || December 7, 2005 || Kitt Peak || Spacewatch ||  || align=right | 3.9 km || 
|-id=200 bgcolor=#E9E9E9
| 512200 ||  || — || May 25, 2014 || Haleakala || Pan-STARRS ||  || align=right | 2.8 km || 
|}

512201–512300 

|-bgcolor=#d6d6d6
| 512201 ||  || — || December 29, 2011 || Mount Lemmon || Mount Lemmon Survey ||  || align=right | 3.0 km || 
|-id=202 bgcolor=#E9E9E9
| 512202 ||  || — || October 17, 2006 || Mount Lemmon || Mount Lemmon Survey ||  || align=right | 2.3 km || 
|-id=203 bgcolor=#fefefe
| 512203 ||  || — || October 1, 2000 || Anderson Mesa || LONEOS ||  || align=right data-sort-value="0.75" | 750 m || 
|-id=204 bgcolor=#d6d6d6
| 512204 ||  || — || November 9, 2010 || Mount Lemmon || Mount Lemmon Survey ||  || align=right | 2.5 km || 
|-id=205 bgcolor=#d6d6d6
| 512205 ||  || — || September 15, 2004 || Anderson Mesa || LONEOS ||  || align=right | 3.4 km || 
|-id=206 bgcolor=#d6d6d6
| 512206 ||  || — || February 3, 2012 || Haleakala || Pan-STARRS ||  || align=right | 3.2 km || 
|-id=207 bgcolor=#d6d6d6
| 512207 ||  || — || August 27, 2009 || Kitt Peak || Spacewatch ||  || align=right | 1.9 km || 
|-id=208 bgcolor=#d6d6d6
| 512208 ||  || — || October 8, 2015 || Haleakala || Pan-STARRS ||  || align=right | 3.1 km || 
|-id=209 bgcolor=#E9E9E9
| 512209 ||  || — || April 29, 2014 || Haleakala || Pan-STARRS ||  || align=right | 1.5 km || 
|-id=210 bgcolor=#d6d6d6
| 512210 ||  || — || June 27, 2014 || Haleakala || Pan-STARRS ||  || align=right | 2.8 km || 
|-id=211 bgcolor=#fefefe
| 512211 ||  || — || August 23, 2011 || Haleakala || Pan-STARRS ||  || align=right data-sort-value="0.82" | 820 m || 
|-id=212 bgcolor=#E9E9E9
| 512212 ||  || — || November 9, 2007 || Mount Lemmon || Mount Lemmon Survey ||  || align=right data-sort-value="0.98" | 980 m || 
|-id=213 bgcolor=#fefefe
| 512213 ||  || — || September 4, 2000 || Kitt Peak || Spacewatch ||  || align=right data-sort-value="0.75" | 750 m || 
|-id=214 bgcolor=#d6d6d6
| 512214 ||  || — || April 13, 2008 || Kitt Peak || Spacewatch ||  || align=right | 3.2 km || 
|-id=215 bgcolor=#E9E9E9
| 512215 ||  || — || September 16, 2006 || Catalina || CSS ||  || align=right | 2.0 km || 
|-id=216 bgcolor=#d6d6d6
| 512216 ||  || — || October 23, 2004 || Kitt Peak || Spacewatch ||  || align=right | 3.2 km || 
|-id=217 bgcolor=#d6d6d6
| 512217 ||  || — || October 15, 2004 || Mount Lemmon || Mount Lemmon Survey ||  || align=right | 2.4 km || 
|-id=218 bgcolor=#fefefe
| 512218 ||  || — || August 20, 2011 || Haleakala || Pan-STARRS ||  || align=right data-sort-value="0.78" | 780 m || 
|-id=219 bgcolor=#d6d6d6
| 512219 ||  || — || September 28, 2009 || Kitt Peak || Spacewatch ||  || align=right | 2.7 km || 
|-id=220 bgcolor=#E9E9E9
| 512220 ||  || — || January 18, 2008 || Mount Lemmon || Mount Lemmon Survey ||  || align=right | 1.5 km || 
|-id=221 bgcolor=#E9E9E9
| 512221 ||  || — || July 2, 2015 || Haleakala || Pan-STARRS ||  || align=right | 3.5 km || 
|-id=222 bgcolor=#d6d6d6
| 512222 ||  || — || October 27, 2008 || Kitt Peak || Spacewatch || 3:2 || align=right | 4.5 km || 
|-id=223 bgcolor=#fefefe
| 512223 ||  || — || September 11, 2007 || XuYi || PMO NEO ||  || align=right data-sort-value="0.82" | 820 m || 
|-id=224 bgcolor=#d6d6d6
| 512224 ||  || — || December 27, 2011 || Kitt Peak || Spacewatch ||  || align=right | 3.3 km || 
|-id=225 bgcolor=#fefefe
| 512225 ||  || — || March 13, 2002 || Kitt Peak || Spacewatch ||  || align=right data-sort-value="0.85" | 850 m || 
|-id=226 bgcolor=#d6d6d6
| 512226 ||  || — || March 21, 2002 || Kitt Peak || Spacewatch ||  || align=right | 3.3 km || 
|-id=227 bgcolor=#d6d6d6
| 512227 ||  || — || March 28, 2008 || Kitt Peak || Spacewatch ||  || align=right | 2.5 km || 
|-id=228 bgcolor=#d6d6d6
| 512228 ||  || — || July 25, 2004 || Anderson Mesa || LONEOS ||  || align=right | 3.4 km || 
|-id=229 bgcolor=#d6d6d6
| 512229 ||  || — || April 16, 2007 || Mount Lemmon || Mount Lemmon Survey ||  || align=right | 3.5 km || 
|-id=230 bgcolor=#d6d6d6
| 512230 ||  || — || January 19, 2012 || Mount Lemmon || Mount Lemmon Survey ||  || align=right | 2.9 km || 
|-id=231 bgcolor=#fefefe
| 512231 ||  || — || March 15, 2004 || Kitt Peak || Spacewatch ||  || align=right data-sort-value="0.71" | 710 m || 
|-id=232 bgcolor=#d6d6d6
| 512232 ||  || — || September 15, 2004 || Anderson Mesa || LONEOS ||  || align=right | 2.3 km || 
|-id=233 bgcolor=#d6d6d6
| 512233 ||  || — || April 29, 2008 || Mount Lemmon || Mount Lemmon Survey ||  || align=right | 3.4 km || 
|-id=234 bgcolor=#FFC2E0
| 512234 ||  || — || November 8, 2015 || Atom Site || Space Surveillance Telescope || ATEPHAcritical || align=right data-sort-value="0.28" | 280 m || 
|-id=235 bgcolor=#d6d6d6
| 512235 ||  || — || April 15, 2007 || Catalina || CSS ||  || align=right | 4.1 km || 
|-id=236 bgcolor=#d6d6d6
| 512236 ||  || — || February 26, 2007 || Mount Lemmon || Mount Lemmon Survey ||  || align=right | 3.8 km || 
|-id=237 bgcolor=#E9E9E9
| 512237 ||  || — || September 18, 2006 || Kitt Peak || Spacewatch ||  || align=right | 1.4 km || 
|-id=238 bgcolor=#d6d6d6
| 512238 ||  || — || December 8, 2010 || Mount Lemmon || Mount Lemmon Survey ||  || align=right | 2.3 km || 
|-id=239 bgcolor=#fefefe
| 512239 ||  || — || February 3, 2013 || Haleakala || Pan-STARRS ||  || align=right data-sort-value="0.55" | 550 m || 
|-id=240 bgcolor=#E9E9E9
| 512240 ||  || — || December 6, 2011 || Haleakala || Pan-STARRS ||  || align=right | 1.3 km || 
|-id=241 bgcolor=#E9E9E9
| 512241 ||  || — || October 8, 2010 || Catalina || CSS ||  || align=right | 2.6 km || 
|-id=242 bgcolor=#FFC2E0
| 512242 ||  || — || December 8, 2015 || Haleakala || Pan-STARRS || AMO || align=right data-sort-value="0.75" | 750 m || 
|-id=243 bgcolor=#fefefe
| 512243 ||  || — || July 28, 2009 || Kitt Peak || Spacewatch || H || align=right data-sort-value="0.75" | 750 m || 
|-id=244 bgcolor=#FFC2E0
| 512244 ||  || — || December 31, 2015 || Haleakala || Pan-STARRS || APO +1km || align=right data-sort-value="0.94" | 940 m || 
|-id=245 bgcolor=#FFC2E0
| 512245 ||  || — || January 2, 2016 || Catalina || CSS || ATE || align=right data-sort-value="0.38" | 380 m || 
|-id=246 bgcolor=#C2FFFF
| 512246 ||  || — || August 18, 2011 || Haleakala || Pan-STARRS || L5 || align=right | 12 km || 
|-id=247 bgcolor=#fefefe
| 512247 ||  || — || January 26, 2012 || Mount Lemmon || Mount Lemmon Survey ||  || align=right data-sort-value="0.75" | 750 m || 
|-id=248 bgcolor=#FA8072
| 512248 ||  || — || January 18, 2016 || Haleakala || Pan-STARRS || H || align=right data-sort-value="0.55" | 550 m || 
|-id=249 bgcolor=#fefefe
| 512249 ||  || — || August 30, 2011 || Haleakala || Pan-STARRS || H || align=right data-sort-value="0.59" | 590 m || 
|-id=250 bgcolor=#d6d6d6
| 512250 ||  || — || September 19, 2009 || Mount Lemmon || Mount Lemmon Survey ||  || align=right | 3.0 km || 
|-id=251 bgcolor=#fefefe
| 512251 ||  || — || August 22, 2014 || Haleakala || Pan-STARRS || H || align=right data-sort-value="0.56" | 560 m || 
|-id=252 bgcolor=#fefefe
| 512252 ||  || — || April 25, 2011 || Mount Lemmon || Mount Lemmon Survey || H || align=right data-sort-value="0.66" | 660 m || 
|-id=253 bgcolor=#d6d6d6
| 512253 ||  || — || September 22, 2014 || Haleakala || Pan-STARRS ||  || align=right | 2.3 km || 
|-id=254 bgcolor=#fefefe
| 512254 ||  || — || February 5, 2016 || Haleakala || Pan-STARRS || H || align=right data-sort-value="0.48" | 480 m || 
|-id=255 bgcolor=#fefefe
| 512255 ||  || — || February 5, 2016 || Haleakala || Pan-STARRS || H || align=right data-sort-value="0.64" | 640 m || 
|-id=256 bgcolor=#fefefe
| 512256 ||  || — || January 9, 2003 || Socorro || LINEAR || H || align=right data-sort-value="0.75" | 750 m || 
|-id=257 bgcolor=#d6d6d6
| 512257 ||  || — || June 10, 2007 || Kitt Peak || Spacewatch ||  || align=right | 3.4 km || 
|-id=258 bgcolor=#fefefe
| 512258 ||  || — || February 9, 2005 || Mount Lemmon || Mount Lemmon Survey ||  || align=right data-sort-value="0.73" | 730 m || 
|-id=259 bgcolor=#fefefe
| 512259 ||  || — || August 28, 2013 || Haleakala || Pan-STARRS ||  || align=right | 1.0 km || 
|-id=260 bgcolor=#fefefe
| 512260 ||  || — || February 15, 2012 || Haleakala || Pan-STARRS ||  || align=right data-sort-value="0.71" | 710 m || 
|-id=261 bgcolor=#fefefe
| 512261 ||  || — || March 11, 2005 || Mount Lemmon || Mount Lemmon Survey ||  || align=right data-sort-value="0.73" | 730 m || 
|-id=262 bgcolor=#fefefe
| 512262 ||  || — || August 31, 2014 || Haleakala || Pan-STARRS || H || align=right data-sort-value="0.49" | 490 m || 
|-id=263 bgcolor=#fefefe
| 512263 ||  || — || May 8, 2005 || Mount Lemmon || Mount Lemmon Survey ||  || align=right data-sort-value="0.62" | 620 m || 
|-id=264 bgcolor=#fefefe
| 512264 ||  || — || May 28, 2009 || Kitt Peak || Spacewatch ||  || align=right data-sort-value="0.73" | 730 m || 
|-id=265 bgcolor=#fefefe
| 512265 ||  || — || April 20, 2009 || Mount Lemmon || Mount Lemmon Survey ||  || align=right data-sort-value="0.76" | 760 m || 
|-id=266 bgcolor=#E9E9E9
| 512266 ||  || — || May 7, 2008 || Mount Lemmon || Mount Lemmon Survey ||  || align=right | 1.1 km || 
|-id=267 bgcolor=#fefefe
| 512267 ||  || — || November 1, 2010 || Mount Lemmon || Mount Lemmon Survey ||  || align=right data-sort-value="0.81" | 810 m || 
|-id=268 bgcolor=#fefefe
| 512268 ||  || — || November 3, 2007 || Kitt Peak || Spacewatch ||  || align=right data-sort-value="0.82" | 820 m || 
|-id=269 bgcolor=#fefefe
| 512269 ||  || — || March 10, 2008 || Kitt Peak || Spacewatch || H || align=right data-sort-value="0.57" | 570 m || 
|-id=270 bgcolor=#fefefe
| 512270 ||  || — || April 24, 2006 || Kitt Peak || Spacewatch || H || align=right data-sort-value="0.47" | 470 m || 
|-id=271 bgcolor=#fefefe
| 512271 ||  || — || October 16, 2009 || Catalina || CSS || H || align=right data-sort-value="0.57" | 570 m || 
|-id=272 bgcolor=#fefefe
| 512272 ||  || — || March 1, 2011 || Mount Lemmon || Mount Lemmon Survey || H || align=right data-sort-value="0.62" | 620 m || 
|-id=273 bgcolor=#E9E9E9
| 512273 ||  || — || March 15, 2012 || Haleakala || Pan-STARRS ||  || align=right data-sort-value="0.83" | 830 m || 
|-id=274 bgcolor=#fefefe
| 512274 ||  || — || September 30, 2006 || Mount Lemmon || Mount Lemmon Survey ||  || align=right data-sort-value="0.80" | 800 m || 
|-id=275 bgcolor=#fefefe
| 512275 ||  || — || January 12, 2016 || Haleakala || Pan-STARRS || H || align=right data-sort-value="0.70" | 700 m || 
|-id=276 bgcolor=#E9E9E9
| 512276 ||  || — || January 17, 2007 || Kitt Peak || Spacewatch ||  || align=right | 1.1 km || 
|-id=277 bgcolor=#fefefe
| 512277 ||  || — || September 20, 2011 || Haleakala || Pan-STARRS || H || align=right data-sort-value="0.58" | 580 m || 
|-id=278 bgcolor=#fefefe
| 512278 ||  || — || March 19, 2016 || Haleakala || Pan-STARRS || H || align=right data-sort-value="0.67" | 670 m || 
|-id=279 bgcolor=#fefefe
| 512279 ||  || — || February 9, 2010 || Catalina || CSS || H || align=right data-sort-value="0.79" | 790 m || 
|-id=280 bgcolor=#d6d6d6
| 512280 ||  || — || September 17, 2006 || Anderson Mesa || LONEOS ||  || align=right | 3.6 km || 
|-id=281 bgcolor=#fefefe
| 512281 ||  || — || August 15, 2004 || Campo Imperatore || CINEOS ||  || align=right data-sort-value="0.54" | 540 m || 
|-id=282 bgcolor=#C2FFFF
| 512282 ||  || — || March 21, 2015 || XuYi || PMO NEO || L4 || align=right | 9.7 km || 
|-id=283 bgcolor=#d6d6d6
| 512283 ||  || — || September 12, 2007 || Mount Lemmon || Mount Lemmon Survey ||  || align=right | 3.7 km || 
|-id=284 bgcolor=#E9E9E9
| 512284 ||  || — || September 23, 2008 || Kitt Peak || Spacewatch ||  || align=right | 1.8 km || 
|-id=285 bgcolor=#fefefe
| 512285 ||  || — || December 30, 2007 || Kitt Peak || Spacewatch ||  || align=right data-sort-value="0.70" | 700 m || 
|-id=286 bgcolor=#d6d6d6
| 512286 ||  || — || March 19, 2016 || Haleakala || Pan-STARRS ||  || align=right | 2.5 km || 
|-id=287 bgcolor=#E9E9E9
| 512287 ||  || — || April 11, 2007 || Mount Lemmon || Mount Lemmon Survey ||  || align=right | 1.6 km || 
|-id=288 bgcolor=#fefefe
| 512288 ||  || — || January 10, 2008 || Mount Lemmon || Mount Lemmon Survey ||  || align=right data-sort-value="0.91" | 910 m || 
|-id=289 bgcolor=#E9E9E9
| 512289 ||  || — || March 9, 2007 || Kitt Peak || Spacewatch ||  || align=right | 1.4 km || 
|-id=290 bgcolor=#fefefe
| 512290 ||  || — || December 4, 2007 || Mount Lemmon || Mount Lemmon Survey ||  || align=right data-sort-value="0.74" | 740 m || 
|-id=291 bgcolor=#E9E9E9
| 512291 ||  || — || February 25, 2011 || Mount Lemmon || Mount Lemmon Survey ||  || align=right | 2.2 km || 
|-id=292 bgcolor=#fefefe
| 512292 ||  || — || August 18, 2009 || Kitt Peak || Spacewatch || H || align=right data-sort-value="0.58" | 580 m || 
|-id=293 bgcolor=#d6d6d6
| 512293 ||  || — || April 4, 2005 || Catalina || CSS ||  || align=right | 2.5 km || 
|-id=294 bgcolor=#fefefe
| 512294 ||  || — || October 10, 2004 || Kitt Peak || Spacewatch || H || align=right data-sort-value="0.65" | 650 m || 
|-id=295 bgcolor=#E9E9E9
| 512295 ||  || — || November 29, 2013 || Haleakala || Pan-STARRS ||  || align=right data-sort-value="0.98" | 980 m || 
|-id=296 bgcolor=#E9E9E9
| 512296 ||  || — || October 26, 2013 || Kitt Peak || Spacewatch ||  || align=right | 1.5 km || 
|-id=297 bgcolor=#E9E9E9
| 512297 ||  || — || October 24, 2005 || Kitt Peak || Spacewatch ||  || align=right | 1.0 km || 
|-id=298 bgcolor=#fefefe
| 512298 ||  || — || November 17, 2014 || Haleakala || Pan-STARRS ||  || align=right data-sort-value="0.63" | 630 m || 
|-id=299 bgcolor=#E9E9E9
| 512299 ||  || — || November 2, 2000 || Kitt Peak || Spacewatch ||  || align=right | 1.5 km || 
|-id=300 bgcolor=#fefefe
| 512300 ||  || — || June 12, 2011 || Mount Lemmon || Mount Lemmon Survey || H || align=right data-sort-value="0.65" | 650 m || 
|}

512301–512400 

|-bgcolor=#E9E9E9
| 512301 ||  || — || January 27, 2011 || Mount Lemmon || Mount Lemmon Survey ||  || align=right | 1.3 km || 
|-id=302 bgcolor=#E9E9E9
| 512302 ||  || — || January 20, 2015 || Haleakala || Pan-STARRS ||  || align=right | 2.2 km || 
|-id=303 bgcolor=#fefefe
| 512303 ||  || — || March 2, 2009 || Mount Lemmon || Mount Lemmon Survey ||  || align=right data-sort-value="0.75" | 750 m || 
|-id=304 bgcolor=#E9E9E9
| 512304 ||  || — || October 1, 2013 || Kitt Peak || Spacewatch ||  || align=right | 2.6 km || 
|-id=305 bgcolor=#fefefe
| 512305 ||  || — || October 8, 2014 || Haleakala || Pan-STARRS || H || align=right data-sort-value="0.90" | 900 m || 
|-id=306 bgcolor=#fefefe
| 512306 ||  || — || November 29, 2014 || Mount Lemmon || Mount Lemmon Survey ||  || align=right data-sort-value="0.67" | 670 m || 
|-id=307 bgcolor=#fefefe
| 512307 ||  || — || August 27, 2006 || Kitt Peak || Spacewatch ||  || align=right data-sort-value="0.80" | 800 m || 
|-id=308 bgcolor=#fefefe
| 512308 ||  || — || November 10, 2014 || Haleakala || Pan-STARRS || H || align=right data-sort-value="0.69" | 690 m || 
|-id=309 bgcolor=#fefefe
| 512309 ||  || — || November 28, 2012 || Haleakala || Pan-STARRS || H || align=right data-sort-value="0.55" | 550 m || 
|-id=310 bgcolor=#fefefe
| 512310 ||  || — || April 24, 2003 || Kitt Peak || Spacewatch ||  || align=right data-sort-value="0.65" | 650 m || 
|-id=311 bgcolor=#d6d6d6
| 512311 ||  || — || November 27, 2013 || Haleakala || Pan-STARRS ||  || align=right | 2.6 km || 
|-id=312 bgcolor=#FA8072
| 512312 ||  || — || April 22, 2011 || Kitt Peak || Spacewatch || H || align=right data-sort-value="0.69" | 690 m || 
|-id=313 bgcolor=#E9E9E9
| 512313 ||  || — || January 15, 2015 || Haleakala || Pan-STARRS ||  || align=right | 1.6 km || 
|-id=314 bgcolor=#fefefe
| 512314 ||  || — || April 5, 2003 || Kitt Peak || Spacewatch ||  || align=right data-sort-value="0.68" | 680 m || 
|-id=315 bgcolor=#fefefe
| 512315 ||  || — || April 20, 2006 || Kitt Peak || Spacewatch ||  || align=right data-sort-value="0.88" | 880 m || 
|-id=316 bgcolor=#fefefe
| 512316 ||  || — || May 30, 2009 || Mount Lemmon || Mount Lemmon Survey ||  || align=right data-sort-value="0.70" | 700 m || 
|-id=317 bgcolor=#fefefe
| 512317 ||  || — || December 7, 2012 || Kitt Peak || Spacewatch || H || align=right data-sort-value="0.57" | 570 m || 
|-id=318 bgcolor=#fefefe
| 512318 ||  || — || April 13, 2008 || Mount Lemmon || Mount Lemmon Survey || H || align=right data-sort-value="0.47" | 470 m || 
|-id=319 bgcolor=#E9E9E9
| 512319 ||  || — || May 2, 2016 || Haleakala || Pan-STARRS ||  || align=right data-sort-value="0.85" | 850 m || 
|-id=320 bgcolor=#fefefe
| 512320 ||  || — || September 23, 2014 || Haleakala || Pan-STARRS || H || align=right data-sort-value="0.61" | 610 m || 
|-id=321 bgcolor=#FA8072
| 512321 ||  || — || June 25, 2011 || Haleakala || Pan-STARRS || H || align=right data-sort-value="0.65" | 650 m || 
|-id=322 bgcolor=#fefefe
| 512322 ||  || — || June 4, 2005 || Kitt Peak || Spacewatch ||  || align=right data-sort-value="0.81" | 810 m || 
|-id=323 bgcolor=#fefefe
| 512323 ||  || — || April 16, 2005 || Catalina || CSS || H || align=right data-sort-value="0.79" | 790 m || 
|-id=324 bgcolor=#E9E9E9
| 512324 ||  || — || September 29, 2008 || Catalina || CSS ||  || align=right | 2.1 km || 
|-id=325 bgcolor=#E9E9E9
| 512325 ||  || — || August 14, 2012 || Siding Spring || SSS ||  || align=right | 1.6 km || 
|-id=326 bgcolor=#fefefe
| 512326 ||  || — || November 11, 2009 || Kitt Peak || Spacewatch || H || align=right data-sort-value="0.68" | 680 m || 
|-id=327 bgcolor=#fefefe
| 512327 ||  || — || May 30, 2011 || Haleakala || Pan-STARRS || H || align=right data-sort-value="0.55" | 550 m || 
|-id=328 bgcolor=#d6d6d6
| 512328 ||  || — || May 9, 2005 || Kitt Peak || Spacewatch ||  || align=right | 3.8 km || 
|-id=329 bgcolor=#E9E9E9
| 512329 ||  || — || September 21, 2004 || Anderson Mesa || LONEOS ||  || align=right | 1.8 km || 
|-id=330 bgcolor=#d6d6d6
| 512330 ||  || — || February 16, 2015 || Haleakala || Pan-STARRS ||  || align=right | 2.2 km || 
|-id=331 bgcolor=#fefefe
| 512331 ||  || — || July 13, 2013 || Mount Lemmon || Mount Lemmon Survey ||  || align=right data-sort-value="0.57" | 570 m || 
|-id=332 bgcolor=#E9E9E9
| 512332 ||  || — || November 6, 2013 || Haleakala || Pan-STARRS ||  || align=right | 1.9 km || 
|-id=333 bgcolor=#E9E9E9
| 512333 ||  || — || August 26, 2012 || Siding Spring || SSS ||  || align=right | 1.7 km || 
|-id=334 bgcolor=#d6d6d6
| 512334 ||  || — || September 8, 2011 || Haleakala || Pan-STARRS ||  || align=right | 3.1 km || 
|-id=335 bgcolor=#E9E9E9
| 512335 ||  || — || March 14, 2007 || Mount Lemmon || Mount Lemmon Survey ||  || align=right | 1.5 km || 
|-id=336 bgcolor=#d6d6d6
| 512336 ||  || — || October 1, 2011 || Kitt Peak || Spacewatch ||  || align=right | 2.8 km || 
|-id=337 bgcolor=#d6d6d6
| 512337 ||  || — || August 20, 2011 || Haleakala || Pan-STARRS ||  || align=right | 1.8 km || 
|-id=338 bgcolor=#d6d6d6
| 512338 ||  || — || October 18, 2011 || Haleakala || Pan-STARRS ||  || align=right | 2.3 km || 
|-id=339 bgcolor=#d6d6d6
| 512339 ||  || — || May 21, 2015 || Haleakala || Pan-STARRS ||  || align=right | 2.0 km || 
|-id=340 bgcolor=#d6d6d6
| 512340 ||  || — || February 27, 2009 || Mount Lemmon || Mount Lemmon Survey ||  || align=right | 2.9 km || 
|-id=341 bgcolor=#d6d6d6
| 512341 ||  || — || September 25, 2006 || Mount Lemmon || Mount Lemmon Survey ||  || align=right | 2.3 km || 
|-id=342 bgcolor=#E9E9E9
| 512342 ||  || — || December 22, 2012 || Haleakala || Pan-STARRS ||  || align=right | 2.8 km || 
|-id=343 bgcolor=#fefefe
| 512343 ||  || — || April 24, 2003 || Kitt Peak || Spacewatch ||  || align=right data-sort-value="0.68" | 680 m || 
|-id=344 bgcolor=#fefefe
| 512344 ||  || — || November 27, 2006 || Mount Lemmon || Mount Lemmon Survey || H || align=right data-sort-value="0.62" | 620 m || 
|-id=345 bgcolor=#d6d6d6
| 512345 ||  || — || May 14, 2005 || Kitt Peak || Spacewatch ||  || align=right | 2.9 km || 
|-id=346 bgcolor=#fefefe
| 512346 ||  || — || March 6, 2008 || Mount Lemmon || Mount Lemmon Survey ||  || align=right | 1.0 km || 
|-id=347 bgcolor=#E9E9E9
| 512347 ||  || — || October 20, 2014 || Mount Lemmon || Mount Lemmon Survey ||  || align=right | 1.4 km || 
|-id=348 bgcolor=#fefefe
| 512348 ||  || — || October 24, 2011 || Haleakala || Pan-STARRS || H || align=right data-sort-value="0.71" | 710 m || 
|-id=349 bgcolor=#E9E9E9
| 512349 ||  || — || April 2, 2011 || Mount Lemmon || Mount Lemmon Survey ||  || align=right | 2.4 km || 
|-id=350 bgcolor=#d6d6d6
| 512350 ||  || — || October 19, 2006 || Mount Lemmon || Mount Lemmon Survey ||  || align=right | 2.1 km || 
|-id=351 bgcolor=#E9E9E9
| 512351 ||  || — || December 30, 2005 || Kitt Peak || Spacewatch ||  || align=right | 1.0 km || 
|-id=352 bgcolor=#fefefe
| 512352 ||  || — || October 31, 2010 || Kitt Peak || Spacewatch ||  || align=right data-sort-value="0.94" | 940 m || 
|-id=353 bgcolor=#E9E9E9
| 512353 ||  || — || November 14, 2013 || Mount Lemmon || Mount Lemmon Survey ||  || align=right | 1.6 km || 
|-id=354 bgcolor=#d6d6d6
| 512354 ||  || — || January 3, 2009 || Kitt Peak || Spacewatch ||  || align=right | 2.7 km || 
|-id=355 bgcolor=#FA8072
| 512355 ||  || — || December 18, 2001 || Socorro || LINEAR || H || align=right data-sort-value="0.71" | 710 m || 
|-id=356 bgcolor=#E9E9E9
| 512356 ||  || — || March 29, 2015 || Haleakala || Pan-STARRS ||  || align=right data-sort-value="0.93" | 930 m || 
|-id=357 bgcolor=#d6d6d6
| 512357 ||  || — || January 12, 2013 || Mount Lemmon || Mount Lemmon Survey ||  || align=right | 3.4 km || 
|-id=358 bgcolor=#E9E9E9
| 512358 ||  || — || December 18, 2004 || Mount Lemmon || Mount Lemmon Survey ||  || align=right | 1.6 km || 
|-id=359 bgcolor=#E9E9E9
| 512359 ||  || — || September 13, 2007 || Catalina || CSS ||  || align=right | 2.8 km || 
|-id=360 bgcolor=#fefefe
| 512360 ||  || — || April 5, 2011 || Mount Lemmon || Mount Lemmon Survey ||  || align=right | 1.0 km || 
|-id=361 bgcolor=#E9E9E9
| 512361 ||  || — || August 19, 2012 || Siding Spring || SSS ||  || align=right | 2.0 km || 
|-id=362 bgcolor=#fefefe
| 512362 ||  || — || December 27, 2006 || Mount Lemmon || Mount Lemmon Survey ||  || align=right | 1.00 km || 
|-id=363 bgcolor=#E9E9E9
| 512363 ||  || — || October 26, 2012 || Mount Lemmon || Mount Lemmon Survey ||  || align=right | 1.4 km || 
|-id=364 bgcolor=#fefefe
| 512364 ||  || — || December 10, 2010 || Mount Lemmon || Mount Lemmon Survey ||  || align=right data-sort-value="0.77" | 770 m || 
|-id=365 bgcolor=#E9E9E9
| 512365 ||  || — || January 23, 2006 || Catalina || CSS ||  || align=right | 2.5 km || 
|-id=366 bgcolor=#E9E9E9
| 512366 ||  || — || October 10, 2012 || Haleakala || Pan-STARRS ||  || align=right | 1.7 km || 
|-id=367 bgcolor=#E9E9E9
| 512367 ||  || — || May 20, 2015 || Haleakala || Pan-STARRS ||  || align=right | 2.0 km || 
|-id=368 bgcolor=#fefefe
| 512368 ||  || — || October 28, 2013 || Mount Lemmon || Mount Lemmon Survey ||  || align=right data-sort-value="0.68" | 680 m || 
|-id=369 bgcolor=#fefefe
| 512369 ||  || — || January 8, 2010 || Kitt Peak || Spacewatch || H || align=right data-sort-value="0.63" | 630 m || 
|-id=370 bgcolor=#fefefe
| 512370 ||  || — || November 23, 2014 || Haleakala || Pan-STARRS || H || align=right data-sort-value="0.66" | 660 m || 
|-id=371 bgcolor=#fefefe
| 512371 ||  || — || July 25, 2008 || Mount Lemmon || Mount Lemmon Survey || H || align=right data-sort-value="0.75" | 750 m || 
|-id=372 bgcolor=#E9E9E9
| 512372 ||  || — || December 3, 2013 || Mount Lemmon || Mount Lemmon Survey ||  || align=right data-sort-value="0.89" | 890 m || 
|-id=373 bgcolor=#E9E9E9
| 512373 ||  || — || November 20, 2000 || Socorro || LINEAR ||  || align=right | 1.1 km || 
|-id=374 bgcolor=#d6d6d6
| 512374 ||  || — || September 20, 2011 || Haleakala || Pan-STARRS ||  || align=right | 1.9 km || 
|-id=375 bgcolor=#d6d6d6
| 512375 ||  || — || September 29, 2005 || Catalina || CSS ||  || align=right | 3.2 km || 
|-id=376 bgcolor=#E9E9E9
| 512376 ||  || — || October 2, 2008 || Mount Lemmon || Mount Lemmon Survey ||  || align=right data-sort-value="0.80" | 800 m || 
|-id=377 bgcolor=#d6d6d6
| 512377 ||  || — || September 21, 2011 || Kitt Peak || Spacewatch ||  || align=right | 2.2 km || 
|-id=378 bgcolor=#d6d6d6
| 512378 ||  || — || October 27, 2005 || Mount Lemmon || Mount Lemmon Survey ||  || align=right | 2.3 km || 
|-id=379 bgcolor=#E9E9E9
| 512379 ||  || — || October 8, 2012 || Haleakala || Pan-STARRS ||  || align=right | 2.2 km || 
|-id=380 bgcolor=#E9E9E9
| 512380 ||  || — || December 18, 2004 || Mount Lemmon || Mount Lemmon Survey ||  || align=right | 1.2 km || 
|-id=381 bgcolor=#E9E9E9
| 512381 ||  || — || April 4, 2005 || Mount Lemmon || Mount Lemmon Survey ||  || align=right | 2.2 km || 
|-id=382 bgcolor=#d6d6d6
| 512382 ||  || — || October 17, 2012 || Mount Lemmon || Mount Lemmon Survey ||  || align=right | 2.5 km || 
|-id=383 bgcolor=#E9E9E9
| 512383 ||  || — || October 20, 2003 || Kitt Peak || Spacewatch ||  || align=right | 1.9 km || 
|-id=384 bgcolor=#E9E9E9
| 512384 ||  || — || September 14, 2007 || Mount Lemmon || Mount Lemmon Survey ||  || align=right | 2.5 km || 
|-id=385 bgcolor=#d6d6d6
| 512385 ||  || — || May 18, 2015 || Mount Lemmon || Mount Lemmon Survey ||  || align=right | 3.1 km || 
|-id=386 bgcolor=#fefefe
| 512386 ||  || — || October 2, 2013 || Kitt Peak || Spacewatch ||  || align=right data-sort-value="0.56" | 560 m || 
|-id=387 bgcolor=#E9E9E9
| 512387 ||  || — || January 27, 2006 || Mount Lemmon || Mount Lemmon Survey ||  || align=right | 1.4 km || 
|-id=388 bgcolor=#fefefe
| 512388 ||  || — || August 13, 2009 || Siding Spring || SSS ||  || align=right | 1.1 km || 
|-id=389 bgcolor=#fefefe
| 512389 ||  || — || October 5, 2014 || Haleakala || Pan-STARRS || H || align=right data-sort-value="0.73" | 730 m || 
|-id=390 bgcolor=#d6d6d6
| 512390 ||  || — || June 8, 2016 || Mount Lemmon || Mount Lemmon Survey || Tj (2.99) || align=right | 3.3 km || 
|-id=391 bgcolor=#E9E9E9
| 512391 ||  || — || October 25, 2008 || Catalina || CSS ||  || align=right | 1.1 km || 
|-id=392 bgcolor=#fefefe
| 512392 ||  || — || October 28, 2005 || Catalina || CSS ||  || align=right data-sort-value="0.93" | 930 m || 
|-id=393 bgcolor=#d6d6d6
| 512393 ||  || — || October 15, 2007 || Kitt Peak || Spacewatch ||  || align=right | 2.0 km || 
|-id=394 bgcolor=#E9E9E9
| 512394 ||  || — || January 3, 2013 || Haleakala || Pan-STARRS ||  || align=right | 2.7 km || 
|-id=395 bgcolor=#E9E9E9
| 512395 ||  || — || September 15, 2007 || Mount Lemmon || Mount Lemmon Survey ||  || align=right | 2.6 km || 
|-id=396 bgcolor=#E9E9E9
| 512396 ||  || — || November 19, 2003 || Anderson Mesa || LONEOS ||  || align=right | 2.5 km || 
|-id=397 bgcolor=#E9E9E9
| 512397 ||  || — || April 10, 2015 || Haleakala || Pan-STARRS ||  || align=right | 1.4 km || 
|-id=398 bgcolor=#E9E9E9
| 512398 ||  || — || October 7, 2008 || Mount Lemmon || Mount Lemmon Survey ||  || align=right data-sort-value="0.87" | 870 m || 
|-id=399 bgcolor=#d6d6d6
| 512399 ||  || — || May 21, 2015 || Haleakala || Pan-STARRS ||  || align=right | 2.2 km || 
|-id=400 bgcolor=#d6d6d6
| 512400 ||  || — || November 14, 2012 || Mount Lemmon || Mount Lemmon Survey ||  || align=right | 1.9 km || 
|}

512401–512500 

|-bgcolor=#d6d6d6
| 512401 ||  || — || March 25, 2015 || Haleakala || Pan-STARRS ||  || align=right | 2.8 km || 
|-id=402 bgcolor=#E9E9E9
| 512402 ||  || — || December 6, 2012 || Mount Lemmon || Mount Lemmon Survey ||  || align=right | 1.8 km || 
|-id=403 bgcolor=#E9E9E9
| 512403 ||  || — || May 21, 2015 || Haleakala || Pan-STARRS ||  || align=right data-sort-value="0.98" | 980 m || 
|-id=404 bgcolor=#E9E9E9
| 512404 ||  || — || April 7, 2006 || Kitt Peak || Spacewatch ||  || align=right | 1.7 km || 
|-id=405 bgcolor=#d6d6d6
| 512405 ||  || — || October 1, 2005 || Kitt Peak || Spacewatch ||  || align=right | 2.9 km || 
|-id=406 bgcolor=#fefefe
| 512406 ||  || — || August 16, 2012 || Haleakala || Pan-STARRS ||  || align=right data-sort-value="0.90" | 900 m || 
|-id=407 bgcolor=#fefefe
| 512407 ||  || — || October 20, 2006 || Mount Lemmon || Mount Lemmon Survey ||  || align=right data-sort-value="0.87" | 870 m || 
|-id=408 bgcolor=#d6d6d6
| 512408 ||  || — || September 28, 2006 || Kitt Peak || Spacewatch ||  || align=right | 2.8 km || 
|-id=409 bgcolor=#d6d6d6
| 512409 ||  || — || April 10, 2010 || Mount Lemmon || Mount Lemmon Survey ||  || align=right | 2.7 km || 
|-id=410 bgcolor=#d6d6d6
| 512410 ||  || — || August 19, 2006 || Kitt Peak || Spacewatch ||  || align=right | 2.6 km || 
|-id=411 bgcolor=#E9E9E9
| 512411 ||  || — || October 7, 2007 || Catalina || CSS ||  || align=right | 4.1 km || 
|-id=412 bgcolor=#E9E9E9
| 512412 ||  || — || July 10, 2007 || Siding Spring || SSS ||  || align=right | 2.0 km || 
|-id=413 bgcolor=#fefefe
| 512413 ||  || — || January 27, 2007 || Kitt Peak || Spacewatch ||  || align=right | 1.0 km || 
|-id=414 bgcolor=#d6d6d6
| 512414 ||  || — || April 29, 2010 || WISE || WISE || Tj (2.98) || align=right | 2.8 km || 
|-id=415 bgcolor=#E9E9E9
| 512415 ||  || — || September 8, 2007 || Anderson Mesa || LONEOS ||  || align=right | 2.2 km || 
|-id=416 bgcolor=#d6d6d6
| 512416 ||  || — || October 12, 2005 || Kitt Peak || Spacewatch ||  || align=right | 2.3 km || 
|-id=417 bgcolor=#E9E9E9
| 512417 ||  || — || September 14, 2012 || Catalina || CSS ||  || align=right | 1.6 km || 
|-id=418 bgcolor=#d6d6d6
| 512418 ||  || — || May 9, 2010 || WISE || WISE ||  || align=right | 3.8 km || 
|-id=419 bgcolor=#E9E9E9
| 512419 ||  || — || October 8, 2007 || Mount Lemmon || Mount Lemmon Survey ||  || align=right | 1.3 km || 
|-id=420 bgcolor=#E9E9E9
| 512420 ||  || — || November 6, 2012 || Kitt Peak || Spacewatch ||  || align=right | 1.5 km || 
|-id=421 bgcolor=#E9E9E9
| 512421 ||  || — || March 3, 2009 || Mount Lemmon || Mount Lemmon Survey ||  || align=right | 1.9 km || 
|-id=422 bgcolor=#E9E9E9
| 512422 ||  || — || September 25, 2007 || Mount Lemmon || Mount Lemmon Survey ||  || align=right | 1.8 km || 
|-id=423 bgcolor=#E9E9E9
| 512423 ||  || — || October 10, 2007 || Mount Lemmon || Mount Lemmon Survey ||  || align=right | 2.5 km || 
|-id=424 bgcolor=#E9E9E9
| 512424 ||  || — || October 20, 2012 || Catalina || CSS ||  || align=right | 1.7 km || 
|-id=425 bgcolor=#E9E9E9
| 512425 ||  || — || September 12, 2007 || Mount Lemmon || Mount Lemmon Survey ||  || align=right | 2.1 km || 
|-id=426 bgcolor=#E9E9E9
| 512426 ||  || — || February 9, 2005 || Anderson Mesa || LONEOS ||  || align=right | 5.0 km || 
|-id=427 bgcolor=#E9E9E9
| 512427 ||  || — || February 26, 2014 || Mount Lemmon || Mount Lemmon Survey ||  || align=right | 1.4 km || 
|-id=428 bgcolor=#d6d6d6
| 512428 ||  || — || October 1, 2005 || Mount Lemmon || Mount Lemmon Survey ||  || align=right | 2.8 km || 
|-id=429 bgcolor=#d6d6d6
| 512429 ||  || — || October 1, 2005 || Mount Lemmon || Mount Lemmon Survey ||  || align=right | 2.6 km || 
|-id=430 bgcolor=#fefefe
| 512430 ||  || — || September 23, 2005 || Catalina || CSS ||  || align=right data-sort-value="0.78" | 780 m || 
|-id=431 bgcolor=#d6d6d6
| 512431 ||  || — || April 23, 2010 || WISE || WISE ||  || align=right | 3.2 km || 
|-id=432 bgcolor=#E9E9E9
| 512432 ||  || — || May 2, 2006 || Mount Lemmon || Mount Lemmon Survey ||  || align=right | 1.9 km || 
|-id=433 bgcolor=#E9E9E9
| 512433 ||  || — || March 16, 2010 || Mount Lemmon || Mount Lemmon Survey ||  || align=right data-sort-value="0.95" | 950 m || 
|-id=434 bgcolor=#E9E9E9
| 512434 ||  || — || March 24, 2006 || Mount Lemmon || Mount Lemmon Survey ||  || align=right | 1.2 km || 
|-id=435 bgcolor=#E9E9E9
| 512435 ||  || — || November 12, 2012 || Mount Lemmon || Mount Lemmon Survey ||  || align=right | 1.4 km || 
|-id=436 bgcolor=#E9E9E9
| 512436 ||  || — || May 3, 2006 || Mount Lemmon || Mount Lemmon Survey ||  || align=right | 1.3 km || 
|-id=437 bgcolor=#E9E9E9
| 512437 ||  || — || February 25, 2006 || Mount Lemmon || Mount Lemmon Survey ||  || align=right | 1.7 km || 
|-id=438 bgcolor=#E9E9E9
| 512438 ||  || — || August 10, 2007 || Kitt Peak || Spacewatch ||  || align=right | 1.5 km || 
|-id=439 bgcolor=#fefefe
| 512439 ||  || — || March 1, 2008 || Kitt Peak || Spacewatch ||  || align=right data-sort-value="0.79" | 790 m || 
|-id=440 bgcolor=#E9E9E9
| 512440 ||  || — || April 18, 2015 || Haleakala || Pan-STARRS ||  || align=right | 2.0 km || 
|-id=441 bgcolor=#d6d6d6
| 512441 ||  || — || September 26, 2005 || Catalina || CSS ||  || align=right | 3.1 km || 
|-id=442 bgcolor=#d6d6d6
| 512442 ||  || — || September 24, 2011 || Haleakala || Pan-STARRS ||  || align=right | 2.5 km || 
|-id=443 bgcolor=#d6d6d6
| 512443 ||  || — || September 18, 2006 || Kitt Peak || Spacewatch ||  || align=right | 2.5 km || 
|-id=444 bgcolor=#fefefe
| 512444 ||  || — || July 22, 2006 || Mount Lemmon || Mount Lemmon Survey ||  || align=right data-sort-value="0.71" | 710 m || 
|-id=445 bgcolor=#d6d6d6
| 512445 ||  || — || August 24, 2011 || Haleakala || Pan-STARRS ||  || align=right | 2.5 km || 
|-id=446 bgcolor=#d6d6d6
| 512446 ||  || — || February 26, 2014 || Haleakala || Pan-STARRS ||  || align=right | 2.5 km || 
|-id=447 bgcolor=#d6d6d6
| 512447 ||  || — || September 27, 2011 || Mount Lemmon || Mount Lemmon Survey ||  || align=right | 3.4 km || 
|-id=448 bgcolor=#E9E9E9
| 512448 ||  || — || December 10, 2005 || Kitt Peak || Spacewatch ||  || align=right | 1.2 km || 
|-id=449 bgcolor=#d6d6d6
| 512449 ||  || — || November 2, 2011 || Mount Lemmon || Mount Lemmon Survey ||  || align=right | 2.7 km || 
|-id=450 bgcolor=#E9E9E9
| 512450 ||  || — || September 25, 2007 || Mount Lemmon || Mount Lemmon Survey ||  || align=right | 2.6 km || 
|-id=451 bgcolor=#d6d6d6
| 512451 ||  || — || March 28, 2014 || Mount Lemmon || Mount Lemmon Survey ||  || align=right | 2.4 km || 
|-id=452 bgcolor=#E9E9E9
| 512452 ||  || — || July 3, 2011 || Mount Lemmon || Mount Lemmon Survey ||  || align=right | 2.3 km || 
|-id=453 bgcolor=#fefefe
| 512453 ||  || — || October 30, 2009 || Mount Lemmon || Mount Lemmon Survey ||  || align=right data-sort-value="0.96" | 960 m || 
|-id=454 bgcolor=#fefefe
| 512454 ||  || — || December 15, 2006 || Kitt Peak || Spacewatch ||  || align=right data-sort-value="0.79" | 790 m || 
|-id=455 bgcolor=#d6d6d6
| 512455 ||  || — || December 30, 2007 || Kitt Peak || Spacewatch ||  || align=right | 2.3 km || 
|-id=456 bgcolor=#fefefe
| 512456 ||  || — || August 29, 2005 || Kitt Peak || Spacewatch ||  || align=right data-sort-value="0.81" | 810 m || 
|-id=457 bgcolor=#E9E9E9
| 512457 ||  || — || November 7, 2012 || Mount Lemmon || Mount Lemmon Survey ||  || align=right | 1.8 km || 
|-id=458 bgcolor=#E9E9E9
| 512458 ||  || — || September 16, 2003 || Anderson Mesa || LONEOS ||  || align=right | 1.9 km || 
|-id=459 bgcolor=#E9E9E9
| 512459 ||  || — || October 7, 2008 || Mount Lemmon || Mount Lemmon Survey ||  || align=right data-sort-value="0.80" | 800 m || 
|-id=460 bgcolor=#E9E9E9
| 512460 ||  || — || December 28, 2013 || Kitt Peak || Spacewatch ||  || align=right | 2.0 km || 
|-id=461 bgcolor=#fefefe
| 512461 ||  || — || March 30, 2015 || Haleakala || Pan-STARRS ||  || align=right data-sort-value="0.85" | 850 m || 
|-id=462 bgcolor=#E9E9E9
| 512462 ||  || — || May 24, 2006 || Kitt Peak || Spacewatch ||  || align=right | 2.6 km || 
|-id=463 bgcolor=#fefefe
| 512463 ||  || — || March 25, 2015 || Haleakala || Pan-STARRS ||  || align=right data-sort-value="0.68" | 680 m || 
|-id=464 bgcolor=#E9E9E9
| 512464 ||  || — || October 28, 2008 || Kitt Peak || Spacewatch ||  || align=right | 1.3 km || 
|-id=465 bgcolor=#E9E9E9
| 512465 ||  || — || April 12, 2010 || Mount Lemmon || Mount Lemmon Survey ||  || align=right | 1.9 km || 
|-id=466 bgcolor=#E9E9E9
| 512466 ||  || — || October 8, 2012 || Haleakala || Pan-STARRS ||  || align=right | 1.1 km || 
|-id=467 bgcolor=#E9E9E9
| 512467 ||  || — || October 7, 2012 || Haleakala || Pan-STARRS ||  || align=right | 1.2 km || 
|-id=468 bgcolor=#fefefe
| 512468 ||  || — || January 30, 2011 || Haleakala || Pan-STARRS ||  || align=right data-sort-value="0.78" | 780 m || 
|-id=469 bgcolor=#d6d6d6
| 512469 ||  || — || March 12, 2005 || Kitt Peak || Spacewatch ||  || align=right | 2.0 km || 
|-id=470 bgcolor=#fefefe
| 512470 ||  || — || October 23, 2009 || Mount Lemmon || Mount Lemmon Survey ||  || align=right data-sort-value="0.89" | 890 m || 
|-id=471 bgcolor=#E9E9E9
| 512471 ||  || — || June 24, 2007 || Kitt Peak || Spacewatch ||  || align=right | 1.5 km || 
|-id=472 bgcolor=#fefefe
| 512472 ||  || — || September 2, 2013 || Mount Lemmon || Mount Lemmon Survey ||  || align=right data-sort-value="0.72" | 720 m || 
|-id=473 bgcolor=#E9E9E9
| 512473 ||  || — || January 6, 2010 || Kitt Peak || Spacewatch ||  || align=right | 1.5 km || 
|-id=474 bgcolor=#d6d6d6
| 512474 ||  || — || May 25, 2006 || Mount Lemmon || Mount Lemmon Survey ||  || align=right | 2.8 km || 
|-id=475 bgcolor=#fefefe
| 512475 ||  || — || September 18, 2009 || Kitt Peak || Spacewatch ||  || align=right data-sort-value="0.75" | 750 m || 
|-id=476 bgcolor=#d6d6d6
| 512476 ||  || — || September 26, 2006 || Kitt Peak || Spacewatch ||  || align=right | 2.4 km || 
|-id=477 bgcolor=#fefefe
| 512477 ||  || — || February 9, 2010 || WISE || WISE ||  || align=right | 2.3 km || 
|-id=478 bgcolor=#d6d6d6
| 512478 ||  || — || September 25, 2005 || Kitt Peak || Spacewatch ||  || align=right | 2.4 km || 
|-id=479 bgcolor=#E9E9E9
| 512479 ||  || — || September 19, 2012 || Mount Lemmon || Mount Lemmon Survey ||  || align=right | 1.5 km || 
|-id=480 bgcolor=#d6d6d6
| 512480 ||  || — || July 30, 2005 || Siding Spring || SSS ||  || align=right | 3.2 km || 
|-id=481 bgcolor=#E9E9E9
| 512481 ||  || — || June 15, 2015 || Haleakala || Pan-STARRS ||  || align=right | 1.3 km || 
|-id=482 bgcolor=#fefefe
| 512482 ||  || — || February 15, 2015 || Haleakala || Pan-STARRS ||  || align=right data-sort-value="0.77" | 770 m || 
|-id=483 bgcolor=#E9E9E9
| 512483 ||  || — || October 9, 2012 || Haleakala || Pan-STARRS ||  || align=right | 1.7 km || 
|-id=484 bgcolor=#E9E9E9
| 512484 ||  || — || September 5, 2007 || Anderson Mesa || LONEOS ||  || align=right | 2.3 km || 
|-id=485 bgcolor=#d6d6d6
| 512485 ||  || — || October 29, 2006 || Catalina || CSS ||  || align=right | 3.4 km || 
|-id=486 bgcolor=#d6d6d6
| 512486 ||  || — || June 14, 2005 || Mount Lemmon || Mount Lemmon Survey ||  || align=right | 3.5 km || 
|-id=487 bgcolor=#d6d6d6
| 512487 ||  || — || September 8, 2011 || Kitt Peak || Spacewatch ||  || align=right | 2.0 km || 
|-id=488 bgcolor=#fefefe
| 512488 ||  || — || November 1, 2005 || Mount Lemmon || Mount Lemmon Survey ||  || align=right data-sort-value="0.94" | 940 m || 
|-id=489 bgcolor=#fefefe
| 512489 ||  || — || November 18, 2009 || Kitt Peak || Spacewatch ||  || align=right data-sort-value="0.65" | 650 m || 
|-id=490 bgcolor=#fefefe
| 512490 ||  || — || September 30, 2003 || Kitt Peak || Spacewatch ||  || align=right data-sort-value="0.82" | 820 m || 
|-id=491 bgcolor=#d6d6d6
| 512491 ||  || — || October 27, 2005 || Anderson Mesa || LONEOS ||  || align=right | 4.8 km || 
|-id=492 bgcolor=#d6d6d6
| 512492 ||  || — || November 5, 2007 || Mount Lemmon || Mount Lemmon Survey ||  || align=right | 3.2 km || 
|-id=493 bgcolor=#E9E9E9
| 512493 ||  || — || April 12, 2015 || Haleakala || Pan-STARRS ||  || align=right data-sort-value="0.90" | 900 m || 
|-id=494 bgcolor=#d6d6d6
| 512494 ||  || — || November 24, 2006 || Mount Lemmon || Mount Lemmon Survey ||  || align=right | 2.5 km || 
|-id=495 bgcolor=#fefefe
| 512495 ||  || — || June 26, 2006 || Siding Spring || SSS ||  || align=right data-sort-value="0.76" | 760 m || 
|-id=496 bgcolor=#d6d6d6
| 512496 ||  || — || November 18, 2006 || Kitt Peak || Spacewatch ||  || align=right | 2.3 km || 
|-id=497 bgcolor=#fefefe
| 512497 ||  || — || April 8, 2008 || Mount Lemmon || Mount Lemmon Survey ||  || align=right data-sort-value="0.69" | 690 m || 
|-id=498 bgcolor=#E9E9E9
| 512498 ||  || — || October 23, 2003 || Kitt Peak || Spacewatch ||  || align=right | 2.3 km || 
|-id=499 bgcolor=#d6d6d6
| 512499 ||  || — || June 14, 2004 || Kitt Peak || Spacewatch ||  || align=right | 3.1 km || 
|-id=500 bgcolor=#d6d6d6
| 512500 ||  || — || May 22, 2010 || WISE || WISE ||  || align=right | 3.6 km || 
|}

512501–512600 

|-bgcolor=#fefefe
| 512501 ||  || — || September 16, 2009 || Mount Lemmon || Mount Lemmon Survey ||  || align=right data-sort-value="0.77" | 770 m || 
|-id=502 bgcolor=#d6d6d6
| 512502 ||  || — || September 26, 2011 || Haleakala || Pan-STARRS ||  || align=right | 2.4 km || 
|-id=503 bgcolor=#d6d6d6
| 512503 ||  || — || September 17, 2006 || Kitt Peak || Spacewatch ||  || align=right | 2.0 km || 
|-id=504 bgcolor=#E9E9E9
| 512504 ||  || — || May 1, 2011 || Haleakala || Pan-STARRS ||  || align=right | 1.1 km || 
|-id=505 bgcolor=#d6d6d6
| 512505 ||  || — || July 3, 2005 || Mount Lemmon || Mount Lemmon Survey ||  || align=right | 3.1 km || 
|-id=506 bgcolor=#fefefe
| 512506 ||  || — || September 16, 2009 || Mount Lemmon || Mount Lemmon Survey ||  || align=right data-sort-value="0.80" | 800 m || 
|-id=507 bgcolor=#fefefe
| 512507 ||  || — || October 27, 2009 || Mount Lemmon || Mount Lemmon Survey ||  || align=right data-sort-value="0.82" | 820 m || 
|-id=508 bgcolor=#d6d6d6
| 512508 ||  || — || May 17, 2009 || Mount Lemmon || Mount Lemmon Survey ||  || align=right | 3.2 km || 
|-id=509 bgcolor=#E9E9E9
| 512509 ||  || — || September 15, 2012 || Catalina || CSS ||  || align=right | 1.2 km || 
|-id=510 bgcolor=#E9E9E9
| 512510 ||  || — || May 6, 2006 || Kitt Peak || Spacewatch ||  || align=right | 2.4 km || 
|-id=511 bgcolor=#d6d6d6
| 512511 ||  || — || October 23, 2005 || Catalina || CSS ||  || align=right | 2.7 km || 
|-id=512 bgcolor=#fefefe
| 512512 ||  || — || October 23, 2003 || Kitt Peak || Spacewatch ||  || align=right data-sort-value="0.79" | 790 m || 
|-id=513 bgcolor=#d6d6d6
| 512513 ||  || — || November 3, 2007 || Kitt Peak || Spacewatch ||  || align=right | 1.9 km || 
|-id=514 bgcolor=#E9E9E9
| 512514 ||  || — || April 13, 2015 || Haleakala || Pan-STARRS ||  || align=right | 1.8 km || 
|-id=515 bgcolor=#d6d6d6
| 512515 ||  || — || August 25, 2000 || Socorro || LINEAR ||  || align=right | 3.1 km || 
|-id=516 bgcolor=#fefefe
| 512516 ||  || — || March 14, 2011 || Mount Lemmon || Mount Lemmon Survey ||  || align=right data-sort-value="0.87" | 870 m || 
|-id=517 bgcolor=#fefefe
| 512517 ||  || — || December 28, 2013 || Kitt Peak || Spacewatch ||  || align=right data-sort-value="0.94" | 940 m || 
|-id=518 bgcolor=#E9E9E9
| 512518 ||  || — || December 3, 2012 || Mount Lemmon || Mount Lemmon Survey ||  || align=right | 2.2 km || 
|-id=519 bgcolor=#d6d6d6
| 512519 ||  || — || April 12, 2005 || Mount Lemmon || Mount Lemmon Survey ||  || align=right | 2.0 km || 
|-id=520 bgcolor=#d6d6d6
| 512520 ||  || — || November 1, 2007 || Kitt Peak || Spacewatch ||  || align=right | 2.1 km || 
|-id=521 bgcolor=#d6d6d6
| 512521 ||  || — || August 29, 2005 || Kitt Peak || Spacewatch ||  || align=right | 3.0 km || 
|-id=522 bgcolor=#E9E9E9
| 512522 ||  || — || March 7, 2014 || Mount Lemmon || Mount Lemmon Survey ||  || align=right | 1.6 km || 
|-id=523 bgcolor=#d6d6d6
| 512523 ||  || — || September 29, 2011 || Mount Lemmon || Mount Lemmon Survey ||  || align=right | 2.4 km || 
|-id=524 bgcolor=#E9E9E9
| 512524 ||  || — || December 19, 2004 || Mount Lemmon || Mount Lemmon Survey ||  || align=right | 1.7 km || 
|-id=525 bgcolor=#fefefe
| 512525 ||  || — || August 13, 2012 || Siding Spring || SSS ||  || align=right data-sort-value="0.91" | 910 m || 
|-id=526 bgcolor=#fefefe
| 512526 ||  || — || September 16, 2009 || Kitt Peak || Spacewatch ||  || align=right data-sort-value="0.72" | 720 m || 
|-id=527 bgcolor=#d6d6d6
| 512527 ||  || — || December 19, 2007 || Kitt Peak || Spacewatch ||  || align=right | 2.4 km || 
|-id=528 bgcolor=#fefefe
| 512528 ||  || — || April 3, 2008 || Mount Lemmon || Mount Lemmon Survey ||  || align=right data-sort-value="0.72" | 720 m || 
|-id=529 bgcolor=#E9E9E9
| 512529 ||  || — || September 10, 2007 || Kitt Peak || Spacewatch ||  || align=right | 1.8 km || 
|-id=530 bgcolor=#d6d6d6
| 512530 ||  || — || May 19, 2010 || WISE || WISE ||  || align=right | 3.2 km || 
|-id=531 bgcolor=#d6d6d6
| 512531 ||  || — || April 18, 2009 || Catalina || CSS ||  || align=right | 3.0 km || 
|-id=532 bgcolor=#E9E9E9
| 512532 ||  || — || March 9, 2005 || Mount Lemmon || Mount Lemmon Survey ||  || align=right | 2.1 km || 
|-id=533 bgcolor=#E9E9E9
| 512533 ||  || — || October 22, 2012 || Haleakala || Pan-STARRS ||  || align=right | 1.2 km || 
|-id=534 bgcolor=#d6d6d6
| 512534 ||  || — || December 15, 2006 || Kitt Peak || Spacewatch ||  || align=right | 2.8 km || 
|-id=535 bgcolor=#d6d6d6
| 512535 ||  || — || June 22, 2015 || Haleakala || Pan-STARRS ||  || align=right | 2.2 km || 
|-id=536 bgcolor=#d6d6d6
| 512536 ||  || — || October 5, 2005 || Catalina || CSS ||  || align=right | 3.5 km || 
|-id=537 bgcolor=#d6d6d6
| 512537 ||  || — || November 14, 2006 || Kitt Peak || Spacewatch ||  || align=right | 3.5 km || 
|-id=538 bgcolor=#d6d6d6
| 512538 ||  || — || December 15, 2006 || Mount Lemmon || Mount Lemmon Survey ||  || align=right | 2.7 km || 
|-id=539 bgcolor=#E9E9E9
| 512539 ||  || — || February 15, 2010 || Mount Lemmon || Mount Lemmon Survey ||  || align=right | 1.6 km || 
|-id=540 bgcolor=#E9E9E9
| 512540 ||  || — || January 27, 2006 || Mount Lemmon || Mount Lemmon Survey ||  || align=right | 1.1 km || 
|-id=541 bgcolor=#E9E9E9
| 512541 ||  || — || February 14, 2005 || Catalina || CSS ||  || align=right | 2.2 km || 
|-id=542 bgcolor=#d6d6d6
| 512542 ||  || — || May 16, 2010 || WISE || WISE ||  || align=right | 4.6 km || 
|-id=543 bgcolor=#d6d6d6
| 512543 ||  || — || November 21, 2006 || Mount Lemmon || Mount Lemmon Survey ||  || align=right | 3.0 km || 
|-id=544 bgcolor=#E9E9E9
| 512544 ||  || — || September 12, 2007 || Catalina || CSS ||  || align=right | 2.4 km || 
|-id=545 bgcolor=#d6d6d6
| 512545 ||  || — || January 18, 2008 || Kitt Peak || Spacewatch ||  || align=right | 2.3 km || 
|-id=546 bgcolor=#E9E9E9
| 512546 ||  || — || January 17, 2005 || Kitt Peak || Spacewatch ||  || align=right | 1.4 km || 
|-id=547 bgcolor=#d6d6d6
| 512547 ||  || — || August 27, 2006 || Kitt Peak || Spacewatch ||  || align=right | 2.9 km || 
|-id=548 bgcolor=#d6d6d6
| 512548 ||  || — || September 1, 2005 || Kitt Peak || Spacewatch ||  || align=right | 2.0 km || 
|-id=549 bgcolor=#d6d6d6
| 512549 ||  || — || December 1, 2006 || Kitt Peak || Spacewatch ||  || align=right | 2.7 km || 
|-id=550 bgcolor=#fefefe
| 512550 ||  || — || June 18, 2005 || Mount Lemmon || Mount Lemmon Survey ||  || align=right data-sort-value="0.82" | 820 m || 
|-id=551 bgcolor=#fefefe
| 512551 ||  || — || March 8, 2005 || Mount Lemmon || Mount Lemmon Survey ||  || align=right data-sort-value="0.75" | 750 m || 
|-id=552 bgcolor=#E9E9E9
| 512552 ||  || — || October 4, 2007 || Kitt Peak || Spacewatch ||  || align=right | 2.0 km || 
|-id=553 bgcolor=#E9E9E9
| 512553 ||  || — || September 5, 2007 || Catalina || CSS ||  || align=right | 1.6 km || 
|-id=554 bgcolor=#d6d6d6
| 512554 ||  || — || February 8, 2008 || Mount Lemmon || Mount Lemmon Survey ||  || align=right | 3.4 km || 
|-id=555 bgcolor=#fefefe
| 512555 ||  || — || February 28, 2008 || Mount Lemmon || Mount Lemmon Survey ||  || align=right data-sort-value="0.74" | 740 m || 
|-id=556 bgcolor=#fefefe
| 512556 ||  || — || October 14, 2001 || Kitt Peak || Spacewatch ||  || align=right | 1.1 km || 
|-id=557 bgcolor=#d6d6d6
| 512557 ||  || — || July 21, 2006 || Mount Lemmon || Mount Lemmon Survey ||  || align=right | 2.8 km || 
|-id=558 bgcolor=#E9E9E9
| 512558 ||  || — || September 10, 2007 || Kitt Peak || Spacewatch ||  || align=right | 2.0 km || 
|-id=559 bgcolor=#d6d6d6
| 512559 ||  || — || May 8, 2014 || Haleakala || Pan-STARRS ||  || align=right | 3.1 km || 
|-id=560 bgcolor=#d6d6d6
| 512560 ||  || — || September 27, 2011 || Mount Lemmon || Mount Lemmon Survey ||  || align=right | 2.6 km || 
|-id=561 bgcolor=#E9E9E9
| 512561 ||  || — || January 1, 2009 || Kitt Peak || Spacewatch ||  || align=right | 2.7 km || 
|-id=562 bgcolor=#E9E9E9
| 512562 ||  || — || November 1, 2008 || Kitt Peak || Spacewatch ||  || align=right | 1.3 km || 
|-id=563 bgcolor=#fefefe
| 512563 ||  || — || July 1, 2005 || Kitt Peak || Spacewatch ||  || align=right data-sort-value="0.65" | 650 m || 
|-id=564 bgcolor=#d6d6d6
| 512564 ||  || — || August 27, 2011 || Haleakala || Pan-STARRS ||  || align=right | 1.9 km || 
|-id=565 bgcolor=#d6d6d6
| 512565 ||  || — || December 1, 2006 || Mount Lemmon || Mount Lemmon Survey ||  || align=right | 3.1 km || 
|-id=566 bgcolor=#d6d6d6
| 512566 ||  || — || February 10, 2008 || Mount Lemmon || Mount Lemmon Survey ||  || align=right | 2.9 km || 
|-id=567 bgcolor=#E9E9E9
| 512567 ||  || — || February 5, 2009 || Kitt Peak || Spacewatch ||  || align=right | 2.5 km || 
|-id=568 bgcolor=#fefefe
| 512568 ||  || — || October 12, 2007 || Kitt Peak || Spacewatch ||  || align=right data-sort-value="0.54" | 540 m || 
|-id=569 bgcolor=#d6d6d6
| 512569 ||  || — || March 18, 2013 || Mount Lemmon || Mount Lemmon Survey || 7:4 || align=right | 3.7 km || 
|-id=570 bgcolor=#fefefe
| 512570 ||  || — || April 27, 2000 || Kitt Peak || Spacewatch ||  || align=right data-sort-value="0.86" | 860 m || 
|-id=571 bgcolor=#d6d6d6
| 512571 ||  || — || May 1, 2003 || Kitt Peak || Spacewatch ||  || align=right | 3.2 km || 
|-id=572 bgcolor=#E9E9E9
| 512572 ||  || — || September 30, 1998 || Kitt Peak || Spacewatch ||  || align=right | 1.6 km || 
|-id=573 bgcolor=#d6d6d6
| 512573 ||  || — || May 3, 2008 || Mount Lemmon || Mount Lemmon Survey ||  || align=right | 3.7 km || 
|-id=574 bgcolor=#E9E9E9
| 512574 ||  || — || October 8, 2012 || Haleakala || Pan-STARRS ||  || align=right data-sort-value="0.95" | 950 m || 
|-id=575 bgcolor=#d6d6d6
| 512575 ||  || — || February 7, 2008 || Mount Lemmon || Mount Lemmon Survey ||  || align=right | 2.8 km || 
|-id=576 bgcolor=#E9E9E9
| 512576 ||  || — || September 6, 2004 || Socorro || LINEAR ||  || align=right | 1.4 km || 
|-id=577 bgcolor=#d6d6d6
| 512577 ||  || — || February 9, 2008 || Kitt Peak || Spacewatch ||  || align=right | 2.9 km || 
|-id=578 bgcolor=#d6d6d6
| 512578 ||  || — || September 30, 2005 || Mount Lemmon || Mount Lemmon Survey ||  || align=right | 3.2 km || 
|-id=579 bgcolor=#E9E9E9
| 512579 ||  || — || September 12, 2007 || Mount Lemmon || Mount Lemmon Survey ||  || align=right | 1.7 km || 
|-id=580 bgcolor=#d6d6d6
| 512580 ||  || — || March 15, 2004 || Kitt Peak || Spacewatch ||  || align=right | 1.8 km || 
|-id=581 bgcolor=#fefefe
| 512581 ||  || — || August 31, 2005 || Kitt Peak || Spacewatch ||  || align=right data-sort-value="0.67" | 670 m || 
|-id=582 bgcolor=#E9E9E9
| 512582 ||  || — || October 9, 2007 || Kitt Peak || Spacewatch ||  || align=right | 1.8 km || 
|-id=583 bgcolor=#E9E9E9
| 512583 ||  || — || April 10, 2010 || Kitt Peak || Spacewatch ||  || align=right | 1.8 km || 
|-id=584 bgcolor=#fefefe
| 512584 ||  || — || July 31, 2009 || Kitt Peak || Spacewatch ||  || align=right data-sort-value="0.75" | 750 m || 
|-id=585 bgcolor=#E9E9E9
| 512585 ||  || — || October 27, 2003 || Kitt Peak || Spacewatch ||  || align=right | 2.0 km || 
|-id=586 bgcolor=#E9E9E9
| 512586 ||  || — || February 16, 2010 || Kitt Peak || Spacewatch ||  || align=right | 1.2 km || 
|-id=587 bgcolor=#fefefe
| 512587 ||  || — || October 30, 2005 || Kitt Peak || Spacewatch ||  || align=right data-sort-value="0.90" | 900 m || 
|-id=588 bgcolor=#E9E9E9
| 512588 ||  || — || September 28, 2003 || Kitt Peak || Spacewatch ||  || align=right | 1.7 km || 
|-id=589 bgcolor=#E9E9E9
| 512589 ||  || — || March 10, 2014 || Mount Lemmon || Mount Lemmon Survey ||  || align=right | 1.4 km || 
|-id=590 bgcolor=#d6d6d6
| 512590 ||  || — || June 11, 2004 || Kitt Peak || Spacewatch ||  || align=right | 4.4 km || 
|-id=591 bgcolor=#d6d6d6
| 512591 ||  || — || August 27, 2005 || Siding Spring || SSS ||  || align=right | 4.2 km || 
|-id=592 bgcolor=#E9E9E9
| 512592 ||  || — || February 21, 2009 || Kitt Peak || Spacewatch ||  || align=right | 2.0 km || 
|-id=593 bgcolor=#E9E9E9
| 512593 ||  || — || September 22, 2016 || Haleakala || Pan-STARRS ||  || align=right | 2.2 km || 
|-id=594 bgcolor=#E9E9E9
| 512594 ||  || — || October 17, 2007 || Anderson Mesa || LONEOS ||  || align=right | 2.5 km || 
|-id=595 bgcolor=#d6d6d6
| 512595 ||  || — || June 19, 2010 || Mount Lemmon || Mount Lemmon Survey ||  || align=right | 3.1 km || 
|-id=596 bgcolor=#d6d6d6
| 512596 ||  || — || April 4, 2014 || Mount Lemmon || Mount Lemmon Survey ||  || align=right | 2.8 km || 
|-id=597 bgcolor=#d6d6d6
| 512597 ||  || — || April 4, 2014 || Haleakala || Pan-STARRS ||  || align=right | 3.4 km || 
|-id=598 bgcolor=#d6d6d6
| 512598 ||  || — || January 17, 2008 || Mount Lemmon || Mount Lemmon Survey ||  || align=right | 2.5 km || 
|-id=599 bgcolor=#fefefe
| 512599 ||  || — || October 14, 2009 || La Sagra || OAM Obs. ||  || align=right | 1.4 km || 
|-id=600 bgcolor=#d6d6d6
| 512600 ||  || — || September 17, 2010 || Mount Lemmon || Mount Lemmon Survey ||  || align=right | 2.8 km || 
|}

512601–512700 

|-bgcolor=#d6d6d6
| 512601 ||  || — || October 11, 2005 || Kitt Peak || Spacewatch ||  || align=right | 2.5 km || 
|-id=602 bgcolor=#E9E9E9
| 512602 ||  || — || December 29, 2008 || Kitt Peak || Spacewatch ||  || align=right | 1.7 km || 
|-id=603 bgcolor=#d6d6d6
| 512603 ||  || — || August 27, 2006 || Kitt Peak || Spacewatch ||  || align=right | 2.5 km || 
|-id=604 bgcolor=#d6d6d6
| 512604 ||  || — || October 24, 2011 || Haleakala || Pan-STARRS ||  || align=right | 4.2 km || 
|-id=605 bgcolor=#d6d6d6
| 512605 ||  || — || March 31, 2008 || Mount Lemmon || Mount Lemmon Survey ||  || align=right | 2.8 km || 
|-id=606 bgcolor=#E9E9E9
| 512606 ||  || — || November 30, 2000 || Anderson Mesa || LONEOS ||  || align=right | 1.1 km || 
|-id=607 bgcolor=#d6d6d6
| 512607 ||  || — || January 27, 2007 || Mount Lemmon || Mount Lemmon Survey ||  || align=right | 3.0 km || 
|-id=608 bgcolor=#fefefe
| 512608 ||  || — || March 26, 2011 || Mount Lemmon || Mount Lemmon Survey ||  || align=right | 1.0 km || 
|-id=609 bgcolor=#d6d6d6
| 512609 ||  || — || September 6, 2016 || Mount Lemmon || Mount Lemmon Survey ||  || align=right | 3.1 km || 
|-id=610 bgcolor=#E9E9E9
| 512610 ||  || — || December 13, 2012 || Mount Lemmon || Mount Lemmon Survey ||  || align=right | 2.0 km || 
|-id=611 bgcolor=#d6d6d6
| 512611 ||  || — || November 1, 2005 || Kitt Peak || Spacewatch ||  || align=right | 3.5 km || 
|-id=612 bgcolor=#E9E9E9
| 512612 ||  || — || February 1, 2005 || Catalina || CSS ||  || align=right | 2.3 km || 
|-id=613 bgcolor=#E9E9E9
| 512613 ||  || — || August 23, 2007 || Kitt Peak || Spacewatch ||  || align=right | 1.6 km || 
|-id=614 bgcolor=#d6d6d6
| 512614 ||  || — || January 30, 2008 || Kitt Peak || Spacewatch ||  || align=right | 2.7 km || 
|-id=615 bgcolor=#E9E9E9
| 512615 ||  || — || October 16, 2007 || Mount Lemmon || Mount Lemmon Survey ||  || align=right | 2.2 km || 
|-id=616 bgcolor=#d6d6d6
| 512616 ||  || — || October 26, 2005 || Kitt Peak || Spacewatch ||  || align=right | 2.7 km || 
|-id=617 bgcolor=#d6d6d6
| 512617 ||  || — || December 27, 2006 || Mount Lemmon || Mount Lemmon Survey ||  || align=right | 2.8 km || 
|-id=618 bgcolor=#E9E9E9
| 512618 ||  || — || April 4, 2014 || Haleakala || Pan-STARRS ||  || align=right | 2.2 km || 
|-id=619 bgcolor=#E9E9E9
| 512619 ||  || — || December 30, 2008 || Kitt Peak || Spacewatch ||  || align=right | 1.4 km || 
|-id=620 bgcolor=#d6d6d6
| 512620 ||  || — || January 11, 2008 || Mount Lemmon || Mount Lemmon Survey ||  || align=right | 3.0 km || 
|-id=621 bgcolor=#d6d6d6
| 512621 ||  || — || November 3, 2011 || Mount Lemmon || Mount Lemmon Survey ||  || align=right | 2.1 km || 
|-id=622 bgcolor=#d6d6d6
| 512622 ||  || — || February 14, 2013 || Haleakala || Pan-STARRS ||  || align=right | 2.5 km || 
|-id=623 bgcolor=#fefefe
| 512623 ||  || — || November 4, 2005 || Kitt Peak || Spacewatch ||  || align=right data-sort-value="0.88" | 880 m || 
|-id=624 bgcolor=#d6d6d6
| 512624 ||  || — || September 26, 2011 || Mount Lemmon || Mount Lemmon Survey ||  || align=right | 1.9 km || 
|-id=625 bgcolor=#d6d6d6
| 512625 ||  || — || September 29, 2005 || Mount Lemmon || Mount Lemmon Survey ||  || align=right | 2.0 km || 
|-id=626 bgcolor=#d6d6d6
| 512626 ||  || — || September 4, 2011 || Haleakala || Pan-STARRS ||  || align=right | 2.0 km || 
|-id=627 bgcolor=#E9E9E9
| 512627 ||  || — || October 30, 2007 || Mount Lemmon || Mount Lemmon Survey ||  || align=right | 1.8 km || 
|-id=628 bgcolor=#d6d6d6
| 512628 ||  || — || September 6, 2008 || Kitt Peak || Spacewatch || 3:2 || align=right | 2.5 km || 
|-id=629 bgcolor=#fefefe
| 512629 ||  || — || March 19, 2001 || Kitt Peak || Spacewatch ||  || align=right data-sort-value="0.85" | 850 m || 
|-id=630 bgcolor=#E9E9E9
| 512630 ||  || — || October 12, 2007 || Kitt Peak || Spacewatch ||  || align=right | 2.1 km || 
|-id=631 bgcolor=#E9E9E9
| 512631 ||  || — || October 10, 2012 || Haleakala || Pan-STARRS ||  || align=right | 1.5 km || 
|-id=632 bgcolor=#d6d6d6
| 512632 ||  || — || April 14, 2008 || Kitt Peak || Spacewatch ||  || align=right | 2.9 km || 
|-id=633 bgcolor=#E9E9E9
| 512633 ||  || — || November 9, 2007 || Kitt Peak || Spacewatch ||  || align=right | 2.1 km || 
|-id=634 bgcolor=#d6d6d6
| 512634 ||  || — || September 28, 2003 || Kitt Peak || Spacewatch || 7:4 || align=right | 3.8 km || 
|-id=635 bgcolor=#E9E9E9
| 512635 ||  || — || April 15, 2005 || Kitt Peak || Spacewatch ||  || align=right | 2.4 km || 
|-id=636 bgcolor=#fefefe
| 512636 ||  || — || October 9, 2004 || Kitt Peak || Spacewatch ||  || align=right | 1.3 km || 
|-id=637 bgcolor=#E9E9E9
| 512637 ||  || — || November 19, 2007 || Kitt Peak || Spacewatch ||  || align=right | 2.3 km || 
|-id=638 bgcolor=#d6d6d6
| 512638 ||  || — || May 24, 2014 || Haleakala || Pan-STARRS ||  || align=right | 2.2 km || 
|-id=639 bgcolor=#d6d6d6
| 512639 ||  || — || December 13, 2006 || Mount Lemmon || Mount Lemmon Survey ||  || align=right | 2.9 km || 
|-id=640 bgcolor=#E9E9E9
| 512640 ||  || — || April 17, 2005 || Kitt Peak || Spacewatch ||  || align=right | 2.1 km || 
|-id=641 bgcolor=#E9E9E9
| 512641 ||  || — || June 25, 2011 || Mount Lemmon || Mount Lemmon Survey ||  || align=right | 2.5 km || 
|-id=642 bgcolor=#d6d6d6
| 512642 ||  || — || December 25, 2011 || Kitt Peak || Spacewatch ||  || align=right | 3.5 km || 
|-id=643 bgcolor=#d6d6d6
| 512643 ||  || — || January 4, 2012 || Kitt Peak || Spacewatch ||  || align=right | 3.0 km || 
|-id=644 bgcolor=#E9E9E9
| 512644 ||  || — || January 21, 2006 || Mount Lemmon || Mount Lemmon Survey ||  || align=right | 1.5 km || 
|-id=645 bgcolor=#E9E9E9
| 512645 ||  || — || September 4, 2007 || Catalina || CSS ||  || align=right | 2.0 km || 
|-id=646 bgcolor=#E9E9E9
| 512646 ||  || — || October 11, 2007 || Kitt Peak || Spacewatch ||  || align=right | 2.0 km || 
|-id=647 bgcolor=#d6d6d6
| 512647 ||  || — || November 5, 2005 || Catalina || CSS ||  || align=right | 3.5 km || 
|-id=648 bgcolor=#E9E9E9
| 512648 ||  || — || May 20, 2006 || Kitt Peak || Spacewatch ||  || align=right | 1.9 km || 
|-id=649 bgcolor=#d6d6d6
| 512649 ||  || — || August 28, 2006 || Kitt Peak || Spacewatch ||  || align=right | 2.5 km || 
|-id=650 bgcolor=#E9E9E9
| 512650 ||  || — || February 26, 2014 || Haleakala || Pan-STARRS ||  || align=right | 2.0 km || 
|-id=651 bgcolor=#d6d6d6
| 512651 ||  || — || April 29, 2008 || Mount Lemmon || Mount Lemmon Survey ||  || align=right | 3.0 km || 
|-id=652 bgcolor=#E9E9E9
| 512652 ||  || — || September 9, 2007 || Mount Lemmon || Mount Lemmon Survey ||  || align=right | 1.9 km || 
|-id=653 bgcolor=#d6d6d6
| 512653 ||  || — || July 6, 2005 || Kitt Peak || Spacewatch ||  || align=right | 3.7 km || 
|-id=654 bgcolor=#d6d6d6
| 512654 ||  || — || April 5, 2014 || Haleakala || Pan-STARRS ||  || align=right | 2.6 km || 
|-id=655 bgcolor=#E9E9E9
| 512655 ||  || — || October 9, 2008 || Mount Lemmon || Mount Lemmon Survey ||  || align=right | 1.4 km || 
|-id=656 bgcolor=#E9E9E9
| 512656 ||  || — || August 21, 2011 || Haleakala || Pan-STARRS ||  || align=right | 1.9 km || 
|-id=657 bgcolor=#d6d6d6
| 512657 ||  || — || September 14, 2005 || Kitt Peak || Spacewatch ||  || align=right | 2.2 km || 
|-id=658 bgcolor=#d6d6d6
| 512658 ||  || — || August 29, 2005 || Kitt Peak || Spacewatch ||  || align=right | 2.6 km || 
|-id=659 bgcolor=#d6d6d6
| 512659 ||  || — || January 1, 2008 || Kitt Peak || Spacewatch ||  || align=right | 2.6 km || 
|-id=660 bgcolor=#d6d6d6
| 512660 ||  || — || June 22, 2010 || Mount Lemmon || Mount Lemmon Survey ||  || align=right | 3.0 km || 
|-id=661 bgcolor=#d6d6d6
| 512661 ||  || — || August 29, 2005 || Kitt Peak || Spacewatch ||  || align=right | 3.0 km || 
|-id=662 bgcolor=#d6d6d6
| 512662 ||  || — || September 23, 2005 || Kitt Peak || Spacewatch ||  || align=right | 2.8 km || 
|-id=663 bgcolor=#E9E9E9
| 512663 ||  || — || October 31, 2007 || Kitt Peak || Spacewatch ||  || align=right | 2.3 km || 
|-id=664 bgcolor=#d6d6d6
| 512664 ||  || — || May 10, 2005 || Kitt Peak || Spacewatch ||  || align=right | 2.6 km || 
|-id=665 bgcolor=#E9E9E9
| 512665 ||  || — || January 1, 2009 || Mount Lemmon || Mount Lemmon Survey ||  || align=right | 1.9 km || 
|-id=666 bgcolor=#d6d6d6
| 512666 ||  || — || September 14, 2006 || Kitt Peak || Spacewatch ||  || align=right | 2.4 km || 
|-id=667 bgcolor=#E9E9E9
| 512667 ||  || — || November 24, 2008 || Kitt Peak || Spacewatch ||  || align=right | 1.0 km || 
|-id=668 bgcolor=#fefefe
| 512668 ||  || — || November 23, 1998 || Kitt Peak || Spacewatch ||  || align=right | 1.0 km || 
|-id=669 bgcolor=#fefefe
| 512669 ||  || — || July 1, 2009 || Siding Spring || SSS ||  || align=right data-sort-value="0.95" | 950 m || 
|-id=670 bgcolor=#E9E9E9
| 512670 ||  || — || October 4, 2003 || Kitt Peak || Spacewatch ||  || align=right | 2.8 km || 
|-id=671 bgcolor=#d6d6d6
| 512671 ||  || — || February 8, 2008 || Mount Lemmon || Mount Lemmon Survey ||  || align=right | 2.7 km || 
|-id=672 bgcolor=#d6d6d6
| 512672 ||  || — || October 10, 2008 || Mount Lemmon || Mount Lemmon Survey || 3:2 || align=right | 3.3 km || 
|-id=673 bgcolor=#E9E9E9
| 512673 ||  || — || October 26, 2008 || Kitt Peak || Spacewatch ||  || align=right | 1.5 km || 
|-id=674 bgcolor=#E9E9E9
| 512674 ||  || — || October 28, 2008 || Kitt Peak || Spacewatch ||  || align=right data-sort-value="0.89" | 890 m || 
|-id=675 bgcolor=#d6d6d6
| 512675 ||  || — || September 30, 2005 || Mount Lemmon || Mount Lemmon Survey ||  || align=right | 2.5 km || 
|-id=676 bgcolor=#fefefe
| 512676 ||  || — || October 1, 2003 || Kitt Peak || Spacewatch ||  || align=right data-sort-value="0.86" | 860 m || 
|-id=677 bgcolor=#E9E9E9
| 512677 ||  || — || December 11, 2004 || Kitt Peak || Spacewatch ||  || align=right | 1.8 km || 
|-id=678 bgcolor=#fefefe
| 512678 ||  || — || January 27, 2011 || Mount Lemmon || Mount Lemmon Survey ||  || align=right | 1.1 km || 
|-id=679 bgcolor=#E9E9E9
| 512679 ||  || — || November 21, 2007 || Mount Lemmon || Mount Lemmon Survey ||  || align=right | 2.9 km || 
|-id=680 bgcolor=#d6d6d6
| 512680 ||  || — || August 29, 2006 || Kitt Peak || Spacewatch ||  || align=right | 2.2 km || 
|-id=681 bgcolor=#d6d6d6
| 512681 ||  || — || September 6, 1999 || Kitt Peak || Spacewatch ||  || align=right | 2.2 km || 
|-id=682 bgcolor=#E9E9E9
| 512682 ||  || — || April 18, 2006 || Kitt Peak || Spacewatch ||  || align=right | 1.0 km || 
|-id=683 bgcolor=#d6d6d6
| 512683 ||  || — || September 10, 2010 || Kitt Peak || Spacewatch ||  || align=right | 2.5 km || 
|-id=684 bgcolor=#E9E9E9
| 512684 ||  || — || January 19, 2005 || Kitt Peak || Spacewatch ||  || align=right | 1.9 km || 
|-id=685 bgcolor=#E9E9E9
| 512685 ||  || — || October 12, 2007 || Anderson Mesa || LONEOS ||  || align=right | 2.5 km || 
|-id=686 bgcolor=#E9E9E9
| 512686 ||  || — || October 27, 2003 || Kitt Peak || Spacewatch ||  || align=right | 1.9 km || 
|-id=687 bgcolor=#d6d6d6
| 512687 ||  || — || February 9, 2008 || Mount Lemmon || Mount Lemmon Survey ||  || align=right | 2.9 km || 
|-id=688 bgcolor=#d6d6d6
| 512688 ||  || — || October 1, 2005 || Mount Lemmon || Mount Lemmon Survey ||  || align=right | 2.3 km || 
|-id=689 bgcolor=#d6d6d6
| 512689 ||  || — || April 17, 2010 || WISE || WISE ||  || align=right | 3.5 km || 
|-id=690 bgcolor=#E9E9E9
| 512690 ||  || — || September 23, 2008 || Kitt Peak || Spacewatch ||  || align=right data-sort-value="0.99" | 990 m || 
|-id=691 bgcolor=#E9E9E9
| 512691 ||  || — || December 30, 2008 || Kitt Peak || Spacewatch ||  || align=right | 1.9 km || 
|-id=692 bgcolor=#d6d6d6
| 512692 ||  || — || January 10, 2013 || Mount Lemmon || Mount Lemmon Survey ||  || align=right | 3.0 km || 
|-id=693 bgcolor=#E9E9E9
| 512693 ||  || — || November 3, 2008 || Mount Lemmon || Mount Lemmon Survey ||  || align=right | 1.0 km || 
|-id=694 bgcolor=#E9E9E9
| 512694 ||  || — || February 20, 2009 || Mount Lemmon || Mount Lemmon Survey ||  || align=right | 1.7 km || 
|-id=695 bgcolor=#E9E9E9
| 512695 ||  || — || September 10, 2008 || Siding Spring || SSS ||  || align=right | 1.2 km || 
|-id=696 bgcolor=#fefefe
| 512696 ||  || — || August 18, 2009 || Kitt Peak || Spacewatch ||  || align=right data-sort-value="0.65" | 650 m || 
|-id=697 bgcolor=#d6d6d6
| 512697 ||  || — || January 10, 2008 || Kitt Peak || Spacewatch ||  || align=right | 2.4 km || 
|-id=698 bgcolor=#E9E9E9
| 512698 ||  || — || January 15, 2009 || Kitt Peak || Spacewatch ||  || align=right | 2.0 km || 
|-id=699 bgcolor=#d6d6d6
| 512699 ||  || — || April 4, 2014 || Haleakala || Pan-STARRS ||  || align=right | 3.4 km || 
|-id=700 bgcolor=#fefefe
| 512700 ||  || — || June 30, 2005 || Catalina || CSS ||  || align=right | 1.1 km || 
|}

512701–512800 

|-bgcolor=#d6d6d6
| 512701 ||  || — || January 12, 2008 || Kitt Peak || Spacewatch ||  || align=right | 2.4 km || 
|-id=702 bgcolor=#E9E9E9
| 512702 ||  || — || February 14, 2010 || Mount Lemmon || Mount Lemmon Survey ||  || align=right | 1.1 km || 
|-id=703 bgcolor=#E9E9E9
| 512703 ||  || — || November 22, 2012 || Kitt Peak || Spacewatch ||  || align=right | 3.0 km || 
|-id=704 bgcolor=#E9E9E9
| 512704 ||  || — || October 22, 2012 || Haleakala || Pan-STARRS ||  || align=right | 1.8 km || 
|-id=705 bgcolor=#d6d6d6
| 512705 ||  || — || September 24, 2008 || Kitt Peak || Spacewatch || 3:2 || align=right | 3.7 km || 
|-id=706 bgcolor=#E9E9E9
| 512706 ||  || — || October 14, 2012 || Kitt Peak || Spacewatch ||  || align=right | 1.2 km || 
|-id=707 bgcolor=#E9E9E9
| 512707 ||  || — || September 22, 2003 || Kitt Peak || Spacewatch ||  || align=right | 1.5 km || 
|-id=708 bgcolor=#E9E9E9
| 512708 ||  || — || September 13, 2007 || Kitt Peak || Spacewatch ||  || align=right | 1.9 km || 
|-id=709 bgcolor=#E9E9E9
| 512709 ||  || — || November 20, 2007 || Kitt Peak || Spacewatch ||  || align=right | 2.1 km || 
|-id=710 bgcolor=#d6d6d6
| 512710 ||  || — || November 30, 2011 || Mount Lemmon || Mount Lemmon Survey ||  || align=right | 2.6 km || 
|-id=711 bgcolor=#d6d6d6
| 512711 ||  || — || November 14, 1999 || Kitt Peak || Spacewatch ||  || align=right | 1.9 km || 
|-id=712 bgcolor=#E9E9E9
| 512712 ||  || — || October 3, 2003 || Kitt Peak || Spacewatch ||  || align=right | 1.6 km || 
|-id=713 bgcolor=#fefefe
| 512713 ||  || — || March 23, 2015 || Haleakala || Pan-STARRS ||  || align=right data-sort-value="0.92" | 920 m || 
|-id=714 bgcolor=#fefefe
| 512714 ||  || — || March 5, 2011 || Mount Lemmon || Mount Lemmon Survey ||  || align=right data-sort-value="0.79" | 790 m || 
|-id=715 bgcolor=#d6d6d6
| 512715 ||  || — || March 10, 2007 || Mount Lemmon || Mount Lemmon Survey ||  || align=right | 2.8 km || 
|-id=716 bgcolor=#d6d6d6
| 512716 ||  || — || November 24, 2011 || Mount Lemmon || Mount Lemmon Survey ||  || align=right | 2.1 km || 
|-id=717 bgcolor=#d6d6d6
| 512717 ||  || — || August 30, 2005 || Kitt Peak || Spacewatch ||  || align=right | 2.4 km || 
|-id=718 bgcolor=#E9E9E9
| 512718 ||  || — || September 25, 1995 || Kitt Peak || Spacewatch ||  || align=right | 1.1 km || 
|-id=719 bgcolor=#E9E9E9
| 512719 ||  || — || January 16, 2009 || Kitt Peak || Spacewatch ||  || align=right | 1.4 km || 
|-id=720 bgcolor=#d6d6d6
| 512720 ||  || — || February 6, 2008 || Kitt Peak || Spacewatch ||  || align=right | 3.1 km || 
|-id=721 bgcolor=#E9E9E9
| 512721 ||  || — || December 30, 2008 || Mount Lemmon || Mount Lemmon Survey ||  || align=right | 1.9 km || 
|-id=722 bgcolor=#d6d6d6
| 512722 ||  || — || September 3, 2010 || Mount Lemmon || Mount Lemmon Survey ||  || align=right | 3.1 km || 
|-id=723 bgcolor=#fefefe
| 512723 ||  || — || August 21, 2006 || Kitt Peak || Spacewatch ||  || align=right data-sort-value="0.75" | 750 m || 
|-id=724 bgcolor=#fefefe
| 512724 ||  || — || June 14, 2008 || Kitt Peak || Spacewatch ||  || align=right data-sort-value="0.88" | 880 m || 
|-id=725 bgcolor=#d6d6d6
| 512725 ||  || — || November 1, 1999 || Kitt Peak || Spacewatch ||  || align=right | 2.3 km || 
|-id=726 bgcolor=#E9E9E9
| 512726 ||  || — || September 16, 2003 || Kitt Peak || Spacewatch ||  || align=right | 1.1 km || 
|-id=727 bgcolor=#d6d6d6
| 512727 ||  || — || October 6, 1999 || Kitt Peak || Spacewatch ||  || align=right | 2.5 km || 
|-id=728 bgcolor=#fefefe
| 512728 ||  || — || September 13, 2005 || Kitt Peak || Spacewatch ||  || align=right data-sort-value="0.71" | 710 m || 
|-id=729 bgcolor=#d6d6d6
| 512729 ||  || — || August 28, 2006 || Kitt Peak || Spacewatch || fast? || align=right | 2.2 km || 
|-id=730 bgcolor=#E9E9E9
| 512730 ||  || — || October 8, 2012 || Haleakala || Pan-STARRS ||  || align=right data-sort-value="0.94" | 940 m || 
|-id=731 bgcolor=#E9E9E9
| 512731 ||  || — || October 12, 2007 || Kitt Peak || Spacewatch ||  || align=right | 1.9 km || 
|-id=732 bgcolor=#d6d6d6
| 512732 ||  || — || April 5, 2014 || Haleakala || Pan-STARRS ||  || align=right | 2.9 km || 
|-id=733 bgcolor=#E9E9E9
| 512733 ||  || — || August 27, 2006 || Kitt Peak || Spacewatch ||  || align=right | 2.5 km || 
|-id=734 bgcolor=#d6d6d6
| 512734 ||  || — || September 13, 2005 || Catalina || CSS ||  || align=right | 2.5 km || 
|-id=735 bgcolor=#d6d6d6
| 512735 ||  || — || February 21, 2002 || Kitt Peak || Spacewatch ||  || align=right | 2.4 km || 
|-id=736 bgcolor=#E9E9E9
| 512736 ||  || — || October 30, 2008 || Kitt Peak || Spacewatch ||  || align=right | 1.1 km || 
|-id=737 bgcolor=#d6d6d6
| 512737 ||  || — || June 18, 2010 || WISE || WISE ||  || align=right | 3.2 km || 
|-id=738 bgcolor=#d6d6d6
| 512738 ||  || — || September 18, 2010 || Mount Lemmon || Mount Lemmon Survey || 7:4 || align=right | 3.2 km || 
|-id=739 bgcolor=#E9E9E9
| 512739 ||  || — || April 5, 2014 || Haleakala || Pan-STARRS ||  || align=right | 1.4 km || 
|-id=740 bgcolor=#d6d6d6
| 512740 ||  || — || May 25, 2010 || WISE || WISE ||  || align=right | 3.1 km || 
|-id=741 bgcolor=#E9E9E9
| 512741 ||  || — || June 26, 2011 || Mount Lemmon || Mount Lemmon Survey ||  || align=right | 1.6 km || 
|-id=742 bgcolor=#E9E9E9
| 512742 ||  || — || September 3, 2007 || Mount Lemmon || Mount Lemmon Survey ||  || align=right | 1.9 km || 
|-id=743 bgcolor=#d6d6d6
| 512743 ||  || — || February 8, 2007 || Mount Lemmon || Mount Lemmon Survey ||  || align=right | 3.0 km || 
|-id=744 bgcolor=#d6d6d6
| 512744 ||  || — || July 23, 2015 || Haleakala || Pan-STARRS ||  || align=right | 2.9 km || 
|-id=745 bgcolor=#E9E9E9
| 512745 ||  || — || March 15, 2015 || Mount Lemmon || Mount Lemmon Survey ||  || align=right | 2.4 km || 
|-id=746 bgcolor=#E9E9E9
| 512746 ||  || — || November 20, 2012 || Catalina || CSS ||  || align=right | 2.0 km || 
|-id=747 bgcolor=#d6d6d6
| 512747 ||  || — || November 19, 2007 || Kitt Peak || Spacewatch ||  || align=right | 2.8 km || 
|-id=748 bgcolor=#d6d6d6
| 512748 ||  || — || November 23, 2011 || Kitt Peak || Spacewatch ||  || align=right | 3.0 km || 
|-id=749 bgcolor=#d6d6d6
| 512749 ||  || — || November 7, 2010 || Socorro || LINEAR ||  || align=right | 3.6 km || 
|-id=750 bgcolor=#d6d6d6
| 512750 ||  || — || May 30, 2010 || WISE || WISE ||  || align=right | 2.6 km || 
|-id=751 bgcolor=#d6d6d6
| 512751 ||  || — || October 30, 2010 || Mount Lemmon || Mount Lemmon Survey || 7:4 || align=right | 3.0 km || 
|-id=752 bgcolor=#d6d6d6
| 512752 ||  || — || September 12, 2004 || Kitt Peak || Spacewatch ||  || align=right | 2.7 km || 
|-id=753 bgcolor=#d6d6d6
| 512753 ||  || — || November 11, 2006 || Kitt Peak || Spacewatch ||  || align=right | 3.3 km || 
|-id=754 bgcolor=#d6d6d6
| 512754 ||  || — || December 21, 2006 || Mount Lemmon || Mount Lemmon Survey ||  || align=right | 3.5 km || 
|-id=755 bgcolor=#d6d6d6
| 512755 ||  || — || August 29, 2005 || Kitt Peak || Spacewatch ||  || align=right | 2.5 km || 
|-id=756 bgcolor=#E9E9E9
| 512756 ||  || — || July 28, 2011 || Haleakala || Pan-STARRS ||  || align=right | 2.2 km || 
|-id=757 bgcolor=#E9E9E9
| 512757 ||  || — || March 10, 2000 || Kitt Peak || Spacewatch ||  || align=right | 2.5 km || 
|-id=758 bgcolor=#d6d6d6
| 512758 ||  || — || April 25, 2010 || WISE || WISE ||  || align=right | 2.5 km || 
|-id=759 bgcolor=#d6d6d6
| 512759 ||  || — || February 8, 2008 || Kitt Peak || Spacewatch ||  || align=right | 3.0 km || 
|-id=760 bgcolor=#fefefe
| 512760 ||  || — || December 10, 2005 || Kitt Peak || Spacewatch ||  || align=right data-sort-value="0.96" | 960 m || 
|-id=761 bgcolor=#d6d6d6
| 512761 ||  || — || September 27, 2005 || Kitt Peak || Spacewatch ||  || align=right | 2.4 km || 
|-id=762 bgcolor=#d6d6d6
| 512762 ||  || — || April 13, 2004 || Kitt Peak || Spacewatch ||  || align=right | 3.0 km || 
|-id=763 bgcolor=#E9E9E9
| 512763 ||  || — || October 21, 2012 || Mount Lemmon || Mount Lemmon Survey ||  || align=right | 1.5 km || 
|-id=764 bgcolor=#d6d6d6
| 512764 ||  || — || June 21, 2010 || WISE || WISE ||  || align=right | 3.0 km || 
|-id=765 bgcolor=#d6d6d6
| 512765 ||  || — || November 19, 1995 || Kitt Peak || Spacewatch ||  || align=right | 2.5 km || 
|-id=766 bgcolor=#d6d6d6
| 512766 ||  || — || April 1, 2013 || Mount Lemmon || Mount Lemmon Survey ||  || align=right | 2.9 km || 
|-id=767 bgcolor=#d6d6d6
| 512767 ||  || — || April 5, 2008 || Mount Lemmon || Mount Lemmon Survey ||  || align=right | 4.6 km || 
|-id=768 bgcolor=#E9E9E9
| 512768 ||  || — || August 24, 2011 || Haleakala || Pan-STARRS ||  || align=right | 1.9 km || 
|-id=769 bgcolor=#d6d6d6
| 512769 ||  || — || February 10, 1996 || Kitt Peak || Spacewatch ||  || align=right | 3.4 km || 
|-id=770 bgcolor=#d6d6d6
| 512770 ||  || — || October 23, 2005 || Catalina || CSS ||  || align=right | 3.4 km || 
|-id=771 bgcolor=#d6d6d6
| 512771 ||  || — || October 1, 2005 || Catalina || CSS ||  || align=right | 2.6 km || 
|-id=772 bgcolor=#E9E9E9
| 512772 ||  || — || April 8, 2010 || Kitt Peak || Spacewatch ||  || align=right | 2.6 km || 
|-id=773 bgcolor=#E9E9E9
| 512773 ||  || — || October 15, 1999 || Kitt Peak || Spacewatch ||  || align=right | 1.8 km || 
|-id=774 bgcolor=#E9E9E9
| 512774 ||  || — || January 31, 2009 || Kitt Peak || Spacewatch ||  || align=right | 2.5 km || 
|-id=775 bgcolor=#E9E9E9
| 512775 ||  || — || December 22, 2008 || Kitt Peak || Spacewatch ||  || align=right | 1.5 km || 
|-id=776 bgcolor=#E9E9E9
| 512776 ||  || — || January 7, 2006 || Kitt Peak || Spacewatch ||  || align=right | 3.0 km || 
|-id=777 bgcolor=#E9E9E9
| 512777 ||  || — || November 2, 2008 || Mount Lemmon || Mount Lemmon Survey ||  || align=right | 1.0 km || 
|-id=778 bgcolor=#d6d6d6
| 512778 ||  || — || September 24, 2008 || Kitt Peak || Spacewatch || 3:2 || align=right | 3.5 km || 
|-id=779 bgcolor=#E9E9E9
| 512779 ||  || — || September 29, 2003 || Anderson Mesa || LONEOS ||  || align=right | 1.6 km || 
|-id=780 bgcolor=#d6d6d6
| 512780 ||  || — || August 19, 2006 || Kitt Peak || Spacewatch ||  || align=right | 1.9 km || 
|-id=781 bgcolor=#fefefe
| 512781 ||  || — || September 29, 2005 || Mount Lemmon || Mount Lemmon Survey ||  || align=right data-sort-value="0.67" | 670 m || 
|-id=782 bgcolor=#d6d6d6
| 512782 ||  || — || September 29, 2005 || Mount Lemmon || Mount Lemmon Survey ||  || align=right | 2.5 km || 
|-id=783 bgcolor=#d6d6d6
| 512783 ||  || — || September 27, 2011 || Mount Lemmon || Mount Lemmon Survey ||  || align=right | 2.2 km || 
|-id=784 bgcolor=#d6d6d6
| 512784 ||  || — || January 12, 2002 || Kitt Peak || Spacewatch || 3:2 || align=right | 3.3 km || 
|-id=785 bgcolor=#d6d6d6
| 512785 ||  || — || September 19, 2011 || Haleakala || Pan-STARRS ||  || align=right | 2.7 km || 
|-id=786 bgcolor=#d6d6d6
| 512786 ||  || — || October 4, 1999 || Kitt Peak || Spacewatch ||  || align=right | 3.9 km || 
|-id=787 bgcolor=#fefefe
| 512787 ||  || — || September 21, 2012 || Mount Lemmon || Mount Lemmon Survey ||  || align=right data-sort-value="0.77" | 770 m || 
|-id=788 bgcolor=#E9E9E9
| 512788 ||  || — || March 11, 2005 || Kitt Peak || Spacewatch ||  || align=right | 1.9 km || 
|-id=789 bgcolor=#d6d6d6
| 512789 ||  || — || August 18, 2006 || Kitt Peak || Spacewatch ||  || align=right | 2.2 km || 
|-id=790 bgcolor=#E9E9E9
| 512790 ||  || — || March 25, 2014 || Kitt Peak || Spacewatch ||  || align=right | 1.6 km || 
|-id=791 bgcolor=#d6d6d6
| 512791 ||  || — || September 30, 2010 || Mount Lemmon || Mount Lemmon Survey ||  || align=right | 2.9 km || 
|-id=792 bgcolor=#d6d6d6
| 512792 ||  || — || January 28, 2010 || WISE || WISE || 7:4 || align=right | 5.8 km || 
|-id=793 bgcolor=#d6d6d6
| 512793 ||  || — || September 1, 2005 || Kitt Peak || Spacewatch ||  || align=right | 2.5 km || 
|-id=794 bgcolor=#E9E9E9
| 512794 ||  || — || May 5, 2006 || Kitt Peak || Spacewatch ||  || align=right | 1.4 km || 
|-id=795 bgcolor=#E9E9E9
| 512795 ||  || — || April 4, 2005 || Mount Lemmon || Mount Lemmon Survey ||  || align=right | 2.2 km || 
|-id=796 bgcolor=#d6d6d6
| 512796 ||  || — || September 28, 1994 || Kitt Peak || Spacewatch ||  || align=right | 2.2 km || 
|-id=797 bgcolor=#d6d6d6
| 512797 ||  || — || August 18, 2006 || Kitt Peak || Spacewatch ||  || align=right | 2.0 km || 
|-id=798 bgcolor=#d6d6d6
| 512798 ||  || — || August 28, 2006 || Kitt Peak || Spacewatch ||  || align=right | 1.9 km || 
|-id=799 bgcolor=#E9E9E9
| 512799 ||  || — || October 30, 2007 || Kitt Peak || Spacewatch ||  || align=right | 1.7 km || 
|-id=800 bgcolor=#d6d6d6
| 512800 ||  || — || October 6, 2005 || Kitt Peak || Spacewatch ||  || align=right | 2.1 km || 
|}

512801–512900 

|-bgcolor=#d6d6d6
| 512801 ||  || — || October 3, 2011 || Mount Lemmon || Mount Lemmon Survey ||  || align=right | 2.0 km || 
|-id=802 bgcolor=#d6d6d6
| 512802 ||  || — || November 18, 2011 || Kitt Peak || Spacewatch ||  || align=right | 1.9 km || 
|-id=803 bgcolor=#d6d6d6
| 512803 ||  || — || September 25, 2006 || Mount Lemmon || Mount Lemmon Survey ||  || align=right | 2.0 km || 
|-id=804 bgcolor=#d6d6d6
| 512804 ||  || — || October 13, 2006 || Kitt Peak || Spacewatch ||  || align=right | 2.1 km || 
|-id=805 bgcolor=#d6d6d6
| 512805 ||  || — || October 11, 1999 || Kitt Peak || Spacewatch ||  || align=right | 2.8 km || 
|-id=806 bgcolor=#E9E9E9
| 512806 ||  || — || October 22, 1995 || Kitt Peak || Spacewatch ||  || align=right data-sort-value="0.99" | 990 m || 
|-id=807 bgcolor=#d6d6d6
| 512807 ||  || — || October 5, 2005 || Kitt Peak || Spacewatch ||  || align=right | 2.3 km || 
|-id=808 bgcolor=#E9E9E9
| 512808 ||  || — || October 6, 1996 || Kitt Peak || Spacewatch ||  || align=right | 1.0 km || 
|-id=809 bgcolor=#E9E9E9
| 512809 ||  || — || May 25, 2006 || Kitt Peak || Spacewatch ||  || align=right | 1.3 km || 
|-id=810 bgcolor=#E9E9E9
| 512810 ||  || — || October 12, 2007 || Kitt Peak || Spacewatch ||  || align=right | 1.8 km || 
|-id=811 bgcolor=#E9E9E9
| 512811 ||  || — || October 19, 2007 || Mount Lemmon || Mount Lemmon Survey ||  || align=right | 1.8 km || 
|-id=812 bgcolor=#E9E9E9
| 512812 ||  || — || October 20, 2008 || Kitt Peak || Spacewatch ||  || align=right data-sort-value="0.94" | 940 m || 
|-id=813 bgcolor=#E9E9E9
| 512813 ||  || — || September 18, 2007 || Kitt Peak || Spacewatch ||  || align=right | 1.4 km || 
|-id=814 bgcolor=#E9E9E9
| 512814 ||  || — || April 16, 2005 || Kitt Peak || Spacewatch ||  || align=right | 2.2 km || 
|-id=815 bgcolor=#E9E9E9
| 512815 ||  || — || April 20, 2010 || Kitt Peak || Spacewatch ||  || align=right | 1.3 km || 
|-id=816 bgcolor=#d6d6d6
| 512816 ||  || — || September 23, 2006 || Kitt Peak || Spacewatch ||  || align=right | 1.7 km || 
|-id=817 bgcolor=#E9E9E9
| 512817 ||  || — || September 15, 2007 || Mount Lemmon || Mount Lemmon Survey ||  || align=right | 1.2 km || 
|-id=818 bgcolor=#E9E9E9
| 512818 ||  || — || October 12, 2007 || Catalina || CSS ||  || align=right | 1.8 km || 
|-id=819 bgcolor=#d6d6d6
| 512819 ||  || — || November 29, 2011 || Kitt Peak || Spacewatch ||  || align=right | 2.6 km || 
|-id=820 bgcolor=#d6d6d6
| 512820 ||  || — || September 16, 2006 || Kitt Peak || Spacewatch || KOR || align=right | 1.5 km || 
|-id=821 bgcolor=#fefefe
| 512821 ||  || — || May 28, 2000 || Socorro || LINEAR ||  || align=right data-sort-value="0.83" | 830 m || 
|-id=822 bgcolor=#E9E9E9
| 512822 ||  || — || April 11, 2005 || Kitt Peak || Spacewatch ||  || align=right | 2.2 km || 
|-id=823 bgcolor=#E9E9E9
| 512823 ||  || — || October 6, 2004 || Kitt Peak || Spacewatch ||  || align=right data-sort-value="0.91" | 910 m || 
|-id=824 bgcolor=#E9E9E9
| 512824 ||  || — || December 20, 2001 || Kitt Peak || Spacewatch ||  || align=right | 1.1 km || 
|-id=825 bgcolor=#d6d6d6
| 512825 ||  || — || March 28, 2014 || Mount Lemmon || Mount Lemmon Survey ||  || align=right | 2.6 km || 
|-id=826 bgcolor=#d6d6d6
| 512826 ||  || — || July 3, 2005 || Mount Lemmon || Mount Lemmon Survey || fast || align=right | 2.3 km || 
|-id=827 bgcolor=#E9E9E9
| 512827 ||  || — || September 16, 2003 || Kitt Peak || Spacewatch ||  || align=right | 1.2 km || 
|-id=828 bgcolor=#d6d6d6
| 512828 ||  || — || September 30, 2005 || Mount Lemmon || Mount Lemmon Survey ||  || align=right | 2.8 km || 
|-id=829 bgcolor=#d6d6d6
| 512829 ||  || — || October 26, 2011 || Haleakala || Pan-STARRS || EOS || align=right | 1.3 km || 
|-id=830 bgcolor=#E9E9E9
| 512830 ||  || — || December 4, 2007 || Mount Lemmon || Mount Lemmon Survey ||  || align=right | 2.6 km || 
|-id=831 bgcolor=#fefefe
| 512831 ||  || — || October 17, 2001 || Kitt Peak || Spacewatch ||  || align=right data-sort-value="0.86" | 860 m || 
|-id=832 bgcolor=#E9E9E9
| 512832 ||  || — || November 19, 2007 || Kitt Peak || Spacewatch ||  || align=right | 1.8 km || 
|-id=833 bgcolor=#d6d6d6
| 512833 ||  || — || October 1, 2005 || Kitt Peak || Spacewatch ||  || align=right | 2.1 km || 
|-id=834 bgcolor=#E9E9E9
| 512834 ||  || — || September 2, 2011 || Haleakala || Pan-STARRS ||  || align=right | 1.7 km || 
|-id=835 bgcolor=#E9E9E9
| 512835 ||  || — || January 1, 2009 || Mount Lemmon || Mount Lemmon Survey ||  || align=right | 1.9 km || 
|-id=836 bgcolor=#d6d6d6
| 512836 ||  || — || October 23, 2011 || Kitt Peak || Spacewatch || EOS || align=right | 1.6 km || 
|-id=837 bgcolor=#d6d6d6
| 512837 ||  || — || September 27, 2011 || Mount Lemmon || Mount Lemmon Survey || EOS || align=right | 1.6 km || 
|-id=838 bgcolor=#E9E9E9
| 512838 ||  || — || September 11, 2007 || Mount Lemmon || Mount Lemmon Survey ||  || align=right | 1.2 km || 
|-id=839 bgcolor=#d6d6d6
| 512839 ||  || — || February 3, 2013 || Haleakala || Pan-STARRS ||  || align=right | 2.4 km || 
|-id=840 bgcolor=#d6d6d6
| 512840 ||  || — || June 23, 2010 || WISE || WISE || Tj (2.99) || align=right | 3.7 km || 
|-id=841 bgcolor=#E9E9E9
| 512841 ||  || — || August 9, 2011 || Haleakala || Pan-STARRS ||  || align=right | 1.4 km || 
|-id=842 bgcolor=#d6d6d6
| 512842 ||  || — || October 4, 1999 || Kitt Peak || Spacewatch ||  || align=right | 3.1 km || 
|-id=843 bgcolor=#fefefe
| 512843 ||  || — || April 22, 2007 || Mount Lemmon || Mount Lemmon Survey ||  || align=right | 1.0 km || 
|-id=844 bgcolor=#E9E9E9
| 512844 ||  || — || October 7, 2007 || Mount Lemmon || Mount Lemmon Survey ||  || align=right | 1.6 km || 
|-id=845 bgcolor=#d6d6d6
| 512845 ||  || — || June 13, 2010 || WISE || WISE ||  || align=right | 3.6 km || 
|-id=846 bgcolor=#fefefe
| 512846 ||  || — || July 9, 2005 || Kitt Peak || Spacewatch ||  || align=right data-sort-value="0.68" | 680 m || 
|-id=847 bgcolor=#E9E9E9
| 512847 ||  || — || December 21, 2008 || Mount Lemmon || Mount Lemmon Survey ||  || align=right | 1.4 km || 
|-id=848 bgcolor=#E9E9E9
| 512848 ||  || — || January 10, 2014 || Mount Lemmon || Mount Lemmon Survey ||  || align=right | 1.2 km || 
|-id=849 bgcolor=#d6d6d6
| 512849 ||  || — || December 1, 2011 || Catalina || CSS ||  || align=right | 4.5 km || 
|-id=850 bgcolor=#d6d6d6
| 512850 ||  || — || March 31, 2008 || Mount Lemmon || Mount Lemmon Survey ||  || align=right | 3.0 km || 
|-id=851 bgcolor=#fefefe
| 512851 ||  || — || September 20, 2008 || Mount Lemmon || Mount Lemmon Survey ||  || align=right data-sort-value="0.56" | 560 m || 
|-id=852 bgcolor=#d6d6d6
| 512852 ||  || — || October 30, 2005 || Mount Lemmon || Mount Lemmon Survey ||  || align=right | 2.6 km || 
|-id=853 bgcolor=#d6d6d6
| 512853 ||  || — || October 17, 2010 || Mount Lemmon || Mount Lemmon Survey ||  || align=right | 3.2 km || 
|-id=854 bgcolor=#d6d6d6
| 512854 ||  || — || October 28, 1994 || Kitt Peak || Spacewatch ||  || align=right | 3.2 km || 
|-id=855 bgcolor=#E9E9E9
| 512855 ||  || — || September 10, 2007 || Mount Lemmon || Mount Lemmon Survey ||  || align=right | 1.5 km || 
|-id=856 bgcolor=#E9E9E9
| 512856 ||  || — || July 2, 2011 || Mount Lemmon || Mount Lemmon Survey ||  || align=right | 1.3 km || 
|-id=857 bgcolor=#d6d6d6
| 512857 ||  || — || April 6, 2008 || Kitt Peak || Spacewatch ||  || align=right | 1.9 km || 
|-id=858 bgcolor=#E9E9E9
| 512858 ||  || — || September 18, 2007 || Kitt Peak || Spacewatch ||  || align=right | 2.7 km || 
|-id=859 bgcolor=#d6d6d6
| 512859 ||  || — || September 18, 2010 || Mount Lemmon || Mount Lemmon Survey ||  || align=right | 2.9 km || 
|-id=860 bgcolor=#d6d6d6
| 512860 ||  || — || October 19, 2011 || Kitt Peak || Spacewatch ||  || align=right | 2.1 km || 
|-id=861 bgcolor=#E9E9E9
| 512861 ||  || — || November 1, 2007 || Kitt Peak || Spacewatch ||  || align=right | 2.1 km || 
|-id=862 bgcolor=#fefefe
| 512862 ||  || — || March 17, 2007 || Kitt Peak || Spacewatch ||  || align=right data-sort-value="0.87" | 870 m || 
|-id=863 bgcolor=#d6d6d6
| 512863 ||  || — || November 19, 2003 || Kitt Peak || Spacewatch || 7:4 || align=right | 4.6 km || 
|-id=864 bgcolor=#d6d6d6
| 512864 ||  || — || July 17, 2010 || WISE || WISE ||  || align=right | 4.2 km || 
|-id=865 bgcolor=#E9E9E9
| 512865 ||  || — || May 19, 2005 || Mount Lemmon || Mount Lemmon Survey ||  || align=right | 2.4 km || 
|-id=866 bgcolor=#E9E9E9
| 512866 ||  || — || March 17, 2009 || Kitt Peak || Spacewatch ||  || align=right | 2.2 km || 
|-id=867 bgcolor=#E9E9E9
| 512867 ||  || — || February 28, 2014 || Haleakala || Pan-STARRS ||  || align=right data-sort-value="0.91" | 910 m || 
|-id=868 bgcolor=#fefefe
| 512868 ||  || — || January 26, 2006 || Mount Lemmon || Mount Lemmon Survey ||  || align=right | 1.2 km || 
|-id=869 bgcolor=#d6d6d6
| 512869 ||  || — || March 4, 2008 || Kitt Peak || Spacewatch ||  || align=right | 2.8 km || 
|-id=870 bgcolor=#d6d6d6
| 512870 ||  || — || April 7, 2008 || Kitt Peak || Spacewatch ||  || align=right | 4.2 km || 
|-id=871 bgcolor=#E9E9E9
| 512871 ||  || — || November 11, 2004 || Kitt Peak || Spacewatch ||  || align=right data-sort-value="0.92" | 920 m || 
|-id=872 bgcolor=#d6d6d6
| 512872 ||  || — || November 25, 2011 || Haleakala || Pan-STARRS ||  || align=right | 2.8 km || 
|-id=873 bgcolor=#d6d6d6
| 512873 ||  || — || February 15, 2013 || Haleakala || Pan-STARRS ||  || align=right | 3.4 km || 
|-id=874 bgcolor=#d6d6d6
| 512874 ||  || — || June 5, 2014 || Mount Lemmon || Mount Lemmon Survey ||  || align=right | 2.3 km || 
|-id=875 bgcolor=#d6d6d6
| 512875 ||  || — || September 10, 2010 || Mount Lemmon || Mount Lemmon Survey ||  || align=right | 2.9 km || 
|-id=876 bgcolor=#d6d6d6
| 512876 ||  || — || June 17, 2010 || Mount Lemmon || Mount Lemmon Survey ||  || align=right | 3.8 km || 
|-id=877 bgcolor=#d6d6d6
| 512877 ||  || — || January 17, 2007 || Kitt Peak || Spacewatch ||  || align=right | 3.3 km || 
|-id=878 bgcolor=#E9E9E9
| 512878 ||  || — || March 11, 2005 || Mount Lemmon || Mount Lemmon Survey ||  || align=right | 2.2 km || 
|-id=879 bgcolor=#E9E9E9
| 512879 ||  || — || October 24, 2008 || Kitt Peak || Spacewatch ||  || align=right | 1.1 km || 
|-id=880 bgcolor=#d6d6d6
| 512880 ||  || — || October 31, 2005 || Kitt Peak || Spacewatch ||  || align=right | 2.7 km || 
|-id=881 bgcolor=#fefefe
| 512881 ||  || — || November 9, 2009 || Kitt Peak || Spacewatch ||  || align=right data-sort-value="0.66" | 660 m || 
|-id=882 bgcolor=#d6d6d6
| 512882 ||  || — || December 1, 2005 || Kitt Peak || Spacewatch ||  || align=right | 3.3 km || 
|-id=883 bgcolor=#E9E9E9
| 512883 ||  || — || November 19, 2007 || Mount Lemmon || Mount Lemmon Survey ||  || align=right | 2.7 km || 
|-id=884 bgcolor=#E9E9E9
| 512884 ||  || — || April 17, 2005 || Kitt Peak || Spacewatch ||  || align=right | 2.2 km || 
|-id=885 bgcolor=#E9E9E9
| 512885 ||  || — || March 29, 2014 || Mount Lemmon || Mount Lemmon Survey ||  || align=right | 2.7 km || 
|-id=886 bgcolor=#d6d6d6
| 512886 ||  || — || April 28, 2010 || WISE || WISE || Tj (2.99) || align=right | 3.2 km || 
|-id=887 bgcolor=#d6d6d6
| 512887 ||  || — || September 16, 2010 || Kitt Peak || Spacewatch ||  || align=right | 2.0 km || 
|-id=888 bgcolor=#d6d6d6
| 512888 ||  || — || November 25, 2005 || Kitt Peak || Spacewatch ||  || align=right | 3.0 km || 
|-id=889 bgcolor=#d6d6d6
| 512889 ||  || — || November 11, 2007 || Mount Lemmon || Mount Lemmon Survey ||  || align=right | 2.5 km || 
|-id=890 bgcolor=#d6d6d6
| 512890 ||  || — || July 18, 2015 || Haleakala || Pan-STARRS ||  || align=right | 2.8 km || 
|-id=891 bgcolor=#E9E9E9
| 512891 ||  || — || April 20, 2010 || Mount Lemmon || Mount Lemmon Survey ||  || align=right | 1.9 km || 
|-id=892 bgcolor=#d6d6d6
| 512892 ||  || — || November 6, 2008 || Mount Lemmon || Mount Lemmon Survey || 3:2 || align=right | 4.8 km || 
|-id=893 bgcolor=#d6d6d6
| 512893 ||  || — || March 15, 2007 || Kitt Peak || Spacewatch ||  || align=right | 2.1 km || 
|-id=894 bgcolor=#d6d6d6
| 512894 ||  || — || June 29, 2010 || WISE || WISE ||  || align=right | 3.2 km || 
|-id=895 bgcolor=#d6d6d6
| 512895 ||  || — || November 18, 1995 || Kitt Peak || Spacewatch ||  || align=right | 4.3 km || 
|-id=896 bgcolor=#E9E9E9
| 512896 ||  || — || May 10, 2005 || Kitt Peak || Spacewatch ||  || align=right | 2.1 km || 
|-id=897 bgcolor=#d6d6d6
| 512897 ||  || — || August 29, 2005 || Anderson Mesa || LONEOS ||  || align=right | 2.8 km || 
|-id=898 bgcolor=#d6d6d6
| 512898 ||  || — || November 20, 2000 || Socorro || LINEAR ||  || align=right | 3.4 km || 
|-id=899 bgcolor=#E9E9E9
| 512899 ||  || — || June 21, 2007 || Mount Lemmon || Mount Lemmon Survey ||  || align=right | 3.3 km || 
|-id=900 bgcolor=#d6d6d6
| 512900 ||  || — || November 30, 2003 || Kitt Peak || Spacewatch || 7:4 || align=right | 3.6 km || 
|}

512901–513000 

|-bgcolor=#E9E9E9
| 512901 ||  || — || December 29, 2008 || Kitt Peak || Spacewatch ||  || align=right data-sort-value="0.87" | 870 m || 
|-id=902 bgcolor=#d6d6d6
| 512902 ||  || — || October 1, 2005 || Kitt Peak || Spacewatch ||  || align=right | 2.5 km || 
|-id=903 bgcolor=#d6d6d6
| 512903 ||  || — || October 25, 2005 || Mount Lemmon || Mount Lemmon Survey ||  || align=right | 3.6 km || 
|-id=904 bgcolor=#d6d6d6
| 512904 ||  || — || March 31, 2008 || Mount Lemmon || Mount Lemmon Survey ||  || align=right | 3.2 km || 
|-id=905 bgcolor=#E9E9E9
| 512905 ||  || — || November 7, 2012 || Mount Lemmon || Mount Lemmon Survey ||  || align=right | 1.8 km || 
|-id=906 bgcolor=#d6d6d6
| 512906 ||  || — || November 30, 1999 || Kitt Peak || Spacewatch ||  || align=right | 2.8 km || 
|-id=907 bgcolor=#fefefe
| 512907 ||  || — || September 29, 2008 || Mount Lemmon || Mount Lemmon Survey || critical || align=right data-sort-value="0.82" | 820 m || 
|-id=908 bgcolor=#E9E9E9
| 512908 ||  || — || January 20, 2009 || Catalina || CSS ||  || align=right | 1.4 km || 
|-id=909 bgcolor=#fefefe
| 512909 ||  || — || November 9, 2009 || Mount Lemmon || Mount Lemmon Survey ||  || align=right data-sort-value="0.55" | 550 m || 
|-id=910 bgcolor=#d6d6d6
| 512910 ||  || — || October 30, 2005 || Kitt Peak || Spacewatch ||  || align=right | 3.3 km || 
|-id=911 bgcolor=#E9E9E9
| 512911 ||  || — || January 18, 2005 || Kitt Peak || Spacewatch ||  || align=right | 1.4 km || 
|-id=912 bgcolor=#d6d6d6
| 512912 ||  || — || May 7, 2008 || Kitt Peak || Spacewatch ||  || align=right | 3.8 km || 
|-id=913 bgcolor=#d6d6d6
| 512913 ||  || — || August 8, 2010 || WISE || WISE ||  || align=right | 3.6 km || 
|-id=914 bgcolor=#d6d6d6
| 512914 ||  || — || November 25, 2000 || Kitt Peak || Spacewatch || 3:2 || align=right | 4.2 km || 
|-id=915 bgcolor=#d6d6d6
| 512915 ||  || — || September 10, 2004 || Kitt Peak || Spacewatch ||  || align=right | 3.3 km || 
|-id=916 bgcolor=#d6d6d6
| 512916 ||  || — || October 29, 2005 || Catalina || CSS ||  || align=right | 3.6 km || 
|-id=917 bgcolor=#E9E9E9
| 512917 ||  || — || December 21, 2008 || Catalina || CSS ||  || align=right | 4.5 km || 
|-id=918 bgcolor=#d6d6d6
| 512918 ||  || — || November 30, 2005 || Socorro || LINEAR ||  || align=right | 3.5 km || 
|-id=919 bgcolor=#d6d6d6
| 512919 ||  || — || September 29, 2011 || Kitt Peak || Spacewatch ||  || align=right | 2.6 km || 
|-id=920 bgcolor=#d6d6d6
| 512920 ||  || — || September 11, 2010 || Kitt Peak || Spacewatch ||  || align=right | 3.1 km || 
|-id=921 bgcolor=#d6d6d6
| 512921 ||  || — || July 28, 2010 || WISE || WISE ||  || align=right | 2.6 km || 
|-id=922 bgcolor=#d6d6d6
| 512922 ||  || — || October 29, 2010 || Mount Lemmon || Mount Lemmon Survey ||  || align=right | 4.4 km || 
|-id=923 bgcolor=#d6d6d6
| 512923 ||  || — || December 29, 2011 || Mount Lemmon || Mount Lemmon Survey ||  || align=right | 4.1 km || 
|-id=924 bgcolor=#d6d6d6
| 512924 ||  || — || November 28, 2006 || Mount Lemmon || Mount Lemmon Survey ||  || align=right | 3.0 km || 
|-id=925 bgcolor=#d6d6d6
| 512925 ||  || — || January 7, 2010 || WISE || WISE ||  || align=right | 6.1 km || 
|-id=926 bgcolor=#d6d6d6
| 512926 ||  || — || January 14, 2008 || Kitt Peak || Spacewatch ||  || align=right | 3.3 km || 
|-id=927 bgcolor=#d6d6d6
| 512927 ||  || — || October 23, 2006 || Kitt Peak || Spacewatch ||  || align=right | 2.6 km || 
|-id=928 bgcolor=#d6d6d6
| 512928 ||  || — || September 19, 2006 || Catalina || CSS ||  || align=right | 2.8 km || 
|-id=929 bgcolor=#d6d6d6
| 512929 ||  || — || October 12, 2010 || Mount Lemmon || Mount Lemmon Survey ||  || align=right | 2.7 km || 
|-id=930 bgcolor=#E9E9E9
| 512930 ||  || — || October 31, 2008 || Mount Lemmon || Mount Lemmon Survey ||  || align=right | 3.5 km || 
|-id=931 bgcolor=#d6d6d6
| 512931 ||  || — || April 14, 2007 || Kitt Peak || Spacewatch ||  || align=right | 3.6 km || 
|-id=932 bgcolor=#d6d6d6
| 512932 ||  || — || January 23, 2006 || Kitt Peak || Spacewatch ||  || align=right | 3.9 km || 
|-id=933 bgcolor=#C2FFFF
| 512933 ||  || — || March 24, 2010 || WISE || WISE || L5 || align=right | 14 km || 
|-id=934 bgcolor=#d6d6d6
| 512934 ||  || — || April 27, 2009 || Mount Lemmon || Mount Lemmon Survey || 7:4* || align=right | 4.3 km || 
|-id=935 bgcolor=#fefefe
| 512935 ||  || — || September 29, 2009 || Mount Lemmon || Mount Lemmon Survey ||  || align=right data-sort-value="0.53" | 530 m || 
|-id=936 bgcolor=#C2FFFF
| 512936 ||  || — || May 1, 2009 || Mount Lemmon || Mount Lemmon Survey || L5 || align=right | 11 km || 
|-id=937 bgcolor=#d6d6d6
| 512937 ||  || — || March 15, 2012 || Mount Lemmon || Mount Lemmon Survey ||  || align=right | 3.2 km || 
|-id=938 bgcolor=#C2FFFF
| 512938 ||  || — || January 9, 2006 || Kitt Peak || Spacewatch || L5 || align=right | 11 km || 
|-id=939 bgcolor=#C2FFFF
| 512939 ||  || — || July 1, 2011 || Mount Lemmon || Mount Lemmon Survey || L5 || align=right | 12 km || 
|-id=940 bgcolor=#d6d6d6
| 512940 ||  || — || September 16, 2003 || Kitt Peak || Spacewatch ||  || align=right | 4.0 km || 
|-id=941 bgcolor=#fefefe
| 512941 ||  || — || September 29, 2009 || Mount Lemmon || Mount Lemmon Survey ||  || align=right data-sort-value="0.68" | 680 m || 
|-id=942 bgcolor=#fefefe
| 512942 ||  || — || November 18, 2006 || Kitt Peak || Spacewatch || critical || align=right data-sort-value="0.62" | 620 m || 
|-id=943 bgcolor=#d6d6d6
| 512943 ||  || — || December 27, 2006 || Mount Lemmon || Mount Lemmon Survey ||  || align=right | 3.3 km || 
|-id=944 bgcolor=#C2FFFF
| 512944 ||  || — || December 22, 2003 || Kitt Peak || Spacewatch || L5 || align=right | 11 km || 
|-id=945 bgcolor=#C2FFFF
| 512945 ||  || — || April 27, 2010 || WISE || WISE || L5 || align=right | 12 km || 
|-id=946 bgcolor=#C2FFFF
| 512946 ||  || — || May 14, 2008 || Kitt Peak || Spacewatch || L5 || align=right | 10 km || 
|-id=947 bgcolor=#C2FFFF
| 512947 ||  || — || September 4, 2014 || Haleakala || Pan-STARRS || L5 || align=right | 9.3 km || 
|-id=948 bgcolor=#d6d6d6
| 512948 ||  || — || December 27, 2005 || Kitt Peak || Spacewatch || Tj (2.93) || align=right | 3.4 km || 
|-id=949 bgcolor=#E9E9E9
| 512949 ||  || — || February 16, 2004 || Kitt Peak || Spacewatch ||  || align=right | 1.4 km || 
|-id=950 bgcolor=#C2FFFF
| 512950 ||  || — || December 28, 2003 || Kitt Peak || Spacewatch || L5 || align=right | 13 km || 
|-id=951 bgcolor=#d6d6d6
| 512951 ||  || — || January 19, 2005 || Kitt Peak || Spacewatch ||  || align=right | 4.4 km || 
|-id=952 bgcolor=#E9E9E9
| 512952 ||  || — || June 6, 2006 || Siding Spring || SSS ||  || align=right | 1.8 km || 
|-id=953 bgcolor=#d6d6d6
| 512953 ||  || — || March 21, 2010 || WISE || WISE || 7:4 || align=right | 3.3 km || 
|-id=954 bgcolor=#E9E9E9
| 512954 ||  || — || August 20, 2009 || Catalina || CSS ||  || align=right | 1.4 km || 
|-id=955 bgcolor=#d6d6d6
| 512955 ||  || — || February 21, 2009 || Kitt Peak || Spacewatch ||  || align=right | 3.7 km || 
|-id=956 bgcolor=#fefefe
| 512956 ||  || — || August 28, 2013 || Haleakala || Pan-STARRS ||  || align=right data-sort-value="0.94" | 940 m || 
|-id=957 bgcolor=#E9E9E9
| 512957 ||  || — || October 9, 2004 || Kitt Peak || Spacewatch ||  || align=right | 1.7 km || 
|-id=958 bgcolor=#d6d6d6
| 512958 ||  || — || August 19, 2012 || Siding Spring || SSS ||  || align=right | 3.1 km || 
|-id=959 bgcolor=#E9E9E9
| 512959 ||  || — || January 25, 2006 || Kitt Peak || Spacewatch ||  || align=right | 1.2 km || 
|-id=960 bgcolor=#d6d6d6
| 512960 ||  || — || April 19, 2009 || Kitt Peak || Spacewatch ||  || align=right | 2.5 km || 
|-id=961 bgcolor=#E9E9E9
| 512961 ||  || — || February 2, 2005 || Kitt Peak || Spacewatch ||  || align=right | 2.3 km || 
|-id=962 bgcolor=#fefefe
| 512962 ||  || — || September 19, 2009 || Kitt Peak || Spacewatch ||  || align=right data-sort-value="0.97" | 970 m || 
|-id=963 bgcolor=#fefefe
| 512963 ||  || — || April 5, 2016 || Haleakala || Pan-STARRS ||  || align=right data-sort-value="0.74" | 740 m || 
|-id=964 bgcolor=#E9E9E9
| 512964 ||  || — || October 16, 2013 || Mount Lemmon || Mount Lemmon Survey ||  || align=right | 1.7 km || 
|-id=965 bgcolor=#d6d6d6
| 512965 ||  || — || December 30, 2007 || Mount Lemmon || Mount Lemmon Survey ||  || align=right | 3.0 km || 
|-id=966 bgcolor=#E9E9E9
| 512966 ||  || — || May 16, 2012 || Mount Lemmon || Mount Lemmon Survey ||  || align=right | 1.7 km || 
|-id=967 bgcolor=#d6d6d6
| 512967 ||  || — || December 20, 2007 || Kitt Peak || Spacewatch ||  || align=right | 2.4 km || 
|-id=968 bgcolor=#E9E9E9
| 512968 ||  || — || March 11, 2016 || Haleakala || Pan-STARRS ||  || align=right | 1.8 km || 
|-id=969 bgcolor=#E9E9E9
| 512969 ||  || — || October 15, 2004 || Mount Lemmon || Mount Lemmon Survey ||  || align=right | 1.6 km || 
|-id=970 bgcolor=#fefefe
| 512970 ||  || — || July 5, 2010 || Kitt Peak || Spacewatch ||  || align=right data-sort-value="0.63" | 630 m || 
|-id=971 bgcolor=#fefefe
| 512971 ||  || — || February 2, 2015 || Haleakala || Pan-STARRS ||  || align=right data-sort-value="0.92" | 920 m || 
|-id=972 bgcolor=#E9E9E9
| 512972 ||  || — || December 20, 2009 || Mount Lemmon || Mount Lemmon Survey ||  || align=right | 1.4 km || 
|-id=973 bgcolor=#E9E9E9
| 512973 ||  || — || March 20, 2012 || Haleakala || Pan-STARRS ||  || align=right | 1.4 km || 
|-id=974 bgcolor=#fefefe
| 512974 ||  || — || July 29, 2014 || Haleakala || Pan-STARRS ||  || align=right data-sort-value="0.62" | 620 m || 
|-id=975 bgcolor=#d6d6d6
| 512975 ||  || — || October 27, 2006 || Catalina || CSS ||  || align=right | 3.1 km || 
|-id=976 bgcolor=#fefefe
| 512976 ||  || — || September 15, 2007 || Anderson Mesa || LONEOS ||  || align=right data-sort-value="0.68" | 680 m || 
|-id=977 bgcolor=#E9E9E9
| 512977 ||  || — || March 13, 2016 || Haleakala || Pan-STARRS ||  || align=right | 1.6 km || 
|-id=978 bgcolor=#E9E9E9
| 512978 ||  || — || October 12, 2009 || La Sagra || OAM Obs. ||  || align=right data-sort-value="0.91" | 910 m || 
|-id=979 bgcolor=#FA8072
| 512979 ||  || — || July 29, 2000 || Anderson Mesa || LONEOS ||  || align=right data-sort-value="0.83" | 830 m || 
|-id=980 bgcolor=#fefefe
| 512980 ||  || — || July 13, 2009 || Kitt Peak || Spacewatch ||  || align=right data-sort-value="0.81" | 810 m || 
|-id=981 bgcolor=#E9E9E9
| 512981 ||  || — || September 22, 2009 || Mount Lemmon || Mount Lemmon Survey ||  || align=right | 1.0 km || 
|-id=982 bgcolor=#d6d6d6
| 512982 ||  || — || September 20, 2001 || Socorro || LINEAR ||  || align=right | 2.6 km || 
|-id=983 bgcolor=#E9E9E9
| 512983 ||  || — || April 28, 2011 || Mount Lemmon || Mount Lemmon Survey ||  || align=right | 2.1 km || 
|-id=984 bgcolor=#d6d6d6
| 512984 ||  || — || February 16, 2009 || Kitt Peak || Spacewatch ||  || align=right | 2.6 km || 
|-id=985 bgcolor=#d6d6d6
| 512985 ||  || — || September 16, 2006 || Kitt Peak || Spacewatch ||  || align=right | 2.3 km || 
|-id=986 bgcolor=#d6d6d6
| 512986 ||  || — || October 19, 2006 || Mount Lemmon || Mount Lemmon Survey ||  || align=right | 2.5 km || 
|-id=987 bgcolor=#fefefe
| 512987 ||  || — || February 11, 2008 || Mount Lemmon || Mount Lemmon Survey ||  || align=right data-sort-value="0.62" | 620 m || 
|-id=988 bgcolor=#E9E9E9
| 512988 ||  || — || November 12, 2013 || Mount Lemmon || Mount Lemmon Survey ||  || align=right | 1.1 km || 
|-id=989 bgcolor=#d6d6d6
| 512989 ||  || — || October 11, 2006 || Kitt Peak || Spacewatch ||  || align=right | 2.6 km || 
|-id=990 bgcolor=#fefefe
| 512990 ||  || — || September 16, 2010 || Mount Lemmon || Mount Lemmon Survey ||  || align=right data-sort-value="0.74" | 740 m || 
|-id=991 bgcolor=#d6d6d6
| 512991 ||  || — || November 10, 2006 || Kitt Peak || Spacewatch ||  || align=right | 3.7 km || 
|-id=992 bgcolor=#fefefe
| 512992 ||  || — || February 2, 2008 || Mount Lemmon || Mount Lemmon Survey ||  || align=right data-sort-value="0.73" | 730 m || 
|-id=993 bgcolor=#d6d6d6
| 512993 ||  || — || September 25, 2006 || Kitt Peak || Spacewatch ||  || align=right | 2.4 km || 
|-id=994 bgcolor=#fefefe
| 512994 ||  || — || September 30, 2013 || Catalina || CSS ||  || align=right data-sort-value="0.92" | 920 m || 
|-id=995 bgcolor=#E9E9E9
| 512995 ||  || — || February 2, 2006 || Kitt Peak || Spacewatch ||  || align=right | 1.8 km || 
|-id=996 bgcolor=#fefefe
| 512996 ||  || — || January 25, 2007 || Kitt Peak || Spacewatch ||  || align=right data-sort-value="0.69" | 690 m || 
|-id=997 bgcolor=#d6d6d6
| 512997 ||  || — || January 10, 2014 || Mount Lemmon || Mount Lemmon Survey ||  || align=right | 2.7 km || 
|-id=998 bgcolor=#E9E9E9
| 512998 ||  || — || August 16, 2012 || Haleakala || Pan-STARRS ||  || align=right | 2.0 km || 
|-id=999 bgcolor=#E9E9E9
| 512999 ||  || — || October 2, 1995 || Kitt Peak || Spacewatch ||  || align=right | 2.2 km || 
|-id=000 bgcolor=#d6d6d6
| 513000 ||  || — || December 20, 2007 || Mount Lemmon || Mount Lemmon Survey ||  || align=right | 2.5 km || 
|}

References

External links 
 Discovery Circumstances: Numbered Minor Planets (510001)–(515000) (IAU Minor Planet Center)

0512